= Suzanne Bart =

American chemist

- Born: Suzanne Cathleen Bart
- Education: University of Delaware; Cornell University
- Scientific career
- Workplaces: Purdue University; University of Erlangen–Nuremberg
- Thesis: Homogeneous iron catalysts with redox-active ligands : synthesis and electronic structure (2006)
- Academic advisors: Paul Chirik, Karsten Meyer
- Website: www.chem.purdue.edu/bart/index.html

Suzanne Cathleen Bart an American chemist who is a professor of inorganic chemistry at Purdue University. Her group's research focuses on actinide organometallic chemistry, and especially the characterization of low-valent organouranium complexes, actinide complexes with redox-active ligands, and discovery of new reactions that utilize these compounds. Bart's research has applications in the development of carbon-neutral fuel sources and the remediation of polluted sites.

== Early life and education ==
Bart was an undergraduate student at the University of Delaware, where she earned her B.S. in 2001. She moved to Cornell University for graduate studies, earning a master's degree in 2003 and a Ph.D. in 2006 working with Paul Chirik. Her doctoral research considered iron catalysts with redox-active ligands. After completing her graduate studies, Bart moved to the University of Erlangen–Nuremberg in Germany, where she worked a postdoctoral researcher with Karsten Meyer.

In 2013, Suzanne Bart, received Purdue University's Outstanding Contributions to Teaching by an Assistant Professor award.

== Research and career ==
Bart began her independent career at Purdue University in 2008. She is interested in the design of new fuels and development of strategies to remediate nuclear waste. She mainly considers actinide chemistry and the organometallic chemistry of depleted uranium and transuranic elements. Depleted uranium emits weak alpha particles with a long half-life, and has considerable potential in the activation of large substrates.

Bart has developed redox-active ligands to transform biologically and industrially relevant small molecules. These ligands can store electrons in the π* orbitals of their conjugated backbone, which facilitates multi-electron redox chemistry. Bart has shown that it is possible to synthesize low-valent uranium alkyls, which avoids the U(IV) state and one-electron (radical) chemistry, the latter of which is harder to synthetically control. Alongside the identification of new chemical transformations, Bart is interested in the fundamentals of carbon-uranium chemical bonding, and the development of efficient catalysts. She has extensively utilized the tris(pyrazolyl)borate ligand.

== Awards and honors ==
- 2014 American Chemical Society Division of Inorganic Chemistry and Organometallics Young Investigator Fellow
- 2015 American Chemical Society Women Chemists Committee Rising Star
- 2024 American Chemical Society F. Albert Cotton Award in Synthetic Inorganic Chemistry

== Selected publications ==
- Bart, Suzanne; Lobkovsky, Emil; Chirik, Paul James (2004). "Preparation and molecular and electronic structures of iron(0) dinitrogen and silane complexes and their application to catalytic hydrogenation and hydrosilation". Journal of the American Chemical Society. 126 (42): 13794–13807. doi:10.1021/ja046753t. PMID 15493939. Wikidata Q45114534.
- Bart, Suzanne; Chlopek, Krzysztof; Bill, Eckhard; Marco W Bouwkamp; Lobkovsky, Emil; Neese, Frank; Wieghardt, Karl; Chirik, Paul James (2006). "Electronic structure of bis(imino)pyridine iron dichloride, monochloride, and neutral ligand complexes: a combined structural, spectroscopic, and computational study". Journal of the American Chemical Society. 128 (42): 13901–13912. doi:10.1021/ja064557b. PMID 17044718. Wikidata Q34574194.
- Alexander R Fox; Bart, Suzanne; Meyer, Karsten; Cummins, Christopher (2008). "Towards uranium catalysts". Nature. 455 (7211): 341–349. doi:10.1038/nature07372. PMID 18800133. Wikidata Q37272554.
