= Swiss Science Prize Latsis =

Swiss science award

- Awarded for: Researchers up to the age of 40 for outstanding achievements in basic science
- Sponsored by: Latsis Foundation
- Country: Switzerland
- Reward: 100,000 Swiss francs
- First award: 1984
- Website: Swiss Science Prize Latsis

The Swiss Science Prize Latsis is awarded annually by the Swiss National Science Foundation (SNSF) to "researchers up to the age of 40 for outstanding achievements in basic science". Formerly the National Latsis Prize, the laureates are selected by the National Research Council and the SNSF presents the award on behalf of the Latsis Foundation of Geneva.

== Laureates ==
Year	Awardee	Domain of research
1984	Jürg Fröhlich	Mathematical physics: quantum theory
1985	Otto Albrecht Haller	Virology: resistance to flu viruses
1986	Ulrich Kohli	Economics: analysis of international trade
1987	John Paul Maier	Physical chemistry: spectroscopic methods for analysing the properties of ionised molecules
1988	Paul Schmid-Hempel (de)	Behavioural ecology
1989	Anne-Nelly Perret-Clermont (de)	Social psychology and educational sciences
1990	Goeffrey Bodenhausen	Nuclear magnetic resonance spectroscopy
1991	Susan Margaret Gasser-Wilson (de)	Cell biology: the role of nucleus proteins in organising and passing on genetic information
1992	Maria Christina Pitassi	History of theology and philosophy in the 17th and 18th century
1993	Thomas Stocker	Climate and environmental physics: the role of the oceans in climate change
1994	Denis Duboule	Developmental biology and genetics
1995	Astrid Epiney	Human rights and international environmental law
1996	Martin Vetterli	Audiovisual technology of the future: wavelet theory in communication
1997	Konrad Basler (de)	Zoology/developmental biology (drosophila fly)
1998	Peter Schaber	Ethics, applied ethics and environmental ethics
1999	Frédéric Merkt (de)	Chemical physics of molecules: spectroscopie and dynamics of atoms and molecules in electronically charged states
2000	Laurent Keller	Evolutionary ecology: ant behaviour
2001	Lorenza Mondada (de)	Interactional linguistics
2002	Jérôme Faist	Solid state physics: quantum cascade laser
2003	Silvia Arber	Neurobiology: neuronal circuit formation in the developing spinal cord
2004	Simon Gächter	Empirical economics: cooperative behaviour
2005	Patrick Jenny	Engineering sciences: computer simulations of complex fluid systems in nature and technology
2006	Michael Hengartner	Molecular biology: study of a model organism, a worm called Caenorhabditis elegans
2007	Giuliano Bonoli	Political science: role of the welfare state in Europe
2008	Franz Pfeiffer	X-ray technology
2009	Mirjam Christ Crain	Medicine: biological stress caused by infectious diseases
2010	Marianne Sommer (de)	History of science: exploring the life sciences
2011	Karl Gademann	Chemistry and biology: isolation and synthesis of natural materials
2012	Jacques Fellay	Genomics: defence mechanisms against viruses
2013	David Sander (de)	Affective science
2014	Tobias J. Kippenberg (de)	Physics: quantum optomechanics
2015	Richard Benton	Neurobiology of olfaction
2016	Alexander Keese (de)	African history, decolonisation, forced labour
2017	Xile Hu	Chemical catalysis
2018	Andrea Ablasser	Immunology
2019	Dominik Hangartner	Political scientist
2020	Maryna Viazovska	Mathematics
2021	Nicola Aceto	Molecular oncology
2022	Kerstin Vokinger (de)	Law, medicine and technology
2023	Lesya Shchutska	Physics: particle physics
2024	Mackenzie Weygandt Mathis	Deep learning for neuroscience
2025	Saskia Stucki	Animal rights

== See also ==
- European Latsis Prize
