= Karsten Meyer (chemist) =

German inorganic chemist (born 1968)

- Born: 17 May 1968 (age 58); Herne, Germany
- Education: Ruhr University Bochum; Max Planck Institute for Chemical Energy Conversion Ph.D. 1998
- Scientific career
- Fields: Inorganic Chemistry, Coordination Chemistry, Bioinorganic Chemistry
- Workplaces: Friedrich–Alexander University Erlangen–Nürnberg (FAU); University of California, San Diego
- Thesis: Molecular and Electronic Structure of High-Valent Transition-Metal Nitrido Complexes (1998)
- Doctoral advisor: Karl Wieghardt
- Other academic advisors: Christopher C. Cummins
- Doctoral students: Xile Hu
- Other notable students: Suzanne Bart
- Website: www.inorgchem2.nat.fau.de

Karsten Meyer (born 17 May 1968 in Herne, Germany) is a German inorganic chemist and Chair of Inorganic and General Chemistry at the Friedrich-Alexander University of Erlangen-Nürnberg (FAU). His research involves the coordination chemistry of transition metals as well as uranium coordination chemistry, small molecule activation with these coordination complexes, and the synthesis of new chelating ligands. He is the 2017 recipient of the Elhuyar-Goldschmidt Award of the Spanish Royal Society of Chemistry, the Ludwig-Mond Award of the Royal Society of Chemistry, and the L.A. Chugaev Commemorative Medal of the Russian Academy of Sciences, among other awards. He also serves as an Associate Editor of the journal Organometallics since 2014.

== Early life and education ==
Meyer was born on 17 May 1968 in Herne, Germany. He studied chemistry at the Ruhr University Bochum, receiving his diploma (in chemistry) in May 1995. In summer 1995, Meyer then joined the laboratory of Professor Karl Wieghardt at the Max Planck Institute for Radiation Chemistry, where he worked on the synthesis of novel high-valent nitrido complexes of manganese, chromium and iron. These nitrido complexes were generated by the photolysis of the corresponding azido complexes. Meyer graduated in January 1998 with his Ph.D. He then moved to the Massachusetts Institute of Technology as a DFG Postdoctoral Fellow in 1998 to conduct research in the laboratory of Professor Christopher Cummins. AT MIT, Meyer worked on amido complexes of uranium with novel amido ligands and dinitrogen cleavage with heterobimetallic complexes of niobium and molybdenum.

== Independent career ==
In 2001, Meyer began his independent career as an assistant professor at the University of California, San Diego. Then in 2006, Meyer moved to the University of Erlangen-Nürnberg as the Chair of the Institute of Inorganic & General Chemistry.

== Research ==
Meyer's early work featured explored the coordination chemistry of uranium with small molecules such as carbon dioxide and light alkanes. Additionally, Meyer's group synthesized novel tripodal N-heterocyclic carbene ligands to stabilize reactive intermediates such as an iron(IV) nitride. In 2011, in collaboration with Prof. Jeremy M. Smith's group, Meyer achieved the first synthesis and characterization of a stable iron(V) nitride complex.

Other research highlights include:

- 2013: In collaboration with Prof. Ingo Krossing's group, the first crystallographic characterization of the 2-norbornyl cation, a prototypical non-classical carbocation whose exact structure has been debated for decades
- 2014: The synthesis of a novel tripodal redox-active ligand class, which was then used to stabilize a low-valent U(II) oxidation state complex
- 2016: The first example of a uranium-based electrocatalyst for the reduction of water to dihydrogen, and the investigation of its reaction mechanism

== Awards ==
- Hellman Fellow, Chris & Warren Hellman Young Faculty Award, 2002
- Faculty Career Development Award, Academic Senate, UCSD, 2003
- Alfred P. Sloan Research Fellowship, 2004
- Lifetime Honorary Member, Israel Chemical Society, 2009
- Visiting Professor at the University of Manchester, since 2009
- Japan Society for the Promotion of Science (JSPS) Award, 2009
- Dalton Transactions European / African Lectureship Award, 2010
- Fellow of the Royal Society of Chemistry, 2011
- JSPS Professorship, "Brain Circulation Project", Nagoya Institute of Technology, 2015
- Elhuyar-Goldschmidt Award, Spanish Royal Society of Chemistry, 2017
- Ludwig Mond Award, Royal Society of Chemistry, 2017
- L.A. Chugaev Commemorative Medal, Russian Academy of Sciences, 2017

== Professional memberships ==
- German Chemical Society (GDCh), since 1995
- American Chemical Society (ACS), since 1997
- Royal Society of Chemistry (RSC), since 2011

== Personal life ==
Meyer's hobbies include nature and macro photography, scuba diving, and driving his car on a closed circuit.
