= Epiney =

Epiney is a surname. Notable people with the surname include:

- Astrid Epiney (born 1965), German-Swiss jurist
- Sébastien Epiney (born 1967), Swiss ski mountaineer and long-distance runner
- Sven Epiney (born 1972), Swiss TV presenter, radio host, and editor
