= Karl Wieghardt =

German inorganic chemist (born 1942)

Karl Weighardt
- Born: July 25, 1942 (age 84)
- Education: Heidelberg University
- Scientific career
- Fields: Inorganic Chemistry, Coordination Chemistry, Bioinorganic Chemistry
- Workplaces: Max Planck Institute for Bioinorganic Chemistry Ruhr University Bochum; TU Hannover; University of Leeds Heidelberg University
- Doctoral advisor: Hans Siebert
- Other academic advisors: A. Geoffrey Sykes
- Doctoral students: Karsten Meyer
- Other notable students: Connie C. Lu (postdoc)

Karl Wieghardt (born 25 July 1942, in Göttingen) is a German inorganic chemist and emeritus director of the Max Planck Institute for Chemical Energy Conversion in Mülheim. He was active in the preparation and detailed characterization of models for iron and manganese metalloenzymes, metal complexes of noninnocent ligands, and magnetic interactions in polynuclear metal complexes.

== Early life and education ==
Wieghardt was born in 1942 in Göttingen, Germany, the son of the physicist Karl Wieghardt and grandson of the mathematician also named Karl Wieghardt. From 1947-1952, Wieghardt lived in England as his father was working at the Admiralty Research Laboratory of the British Navy in Teddington. While in the UK, he attended elementary school in Elstead, Surrey. Following the nuclear espionage affair surrounding Klaus Fuchs, Wieghardt's father was dismissed from the Admiralty Research Laboratory, and he moved his family back to Germany. At the age of 12, Wieghardt obtained a chemistry kit as a Christmas present from his parents, then proceeded to set his basement on fire. His parents then forbade him from doing or studying chemistry for the next eight years. In 1962, Wieghardt graduated from the Johanneum secondary school in Hamburg.

Wieghardt then attended Heidelberg University, where he studied chemistry. Wieghardt obtained his PhD in 1969 at Heidelberg University with Prof. Hans Siebert. His dissertation involved the x-ray structure analysis of multinuclear complexes of cobalt(III). He then conducted postdoctoral studies with Prof. A. Geoffrey Sykes, FRS at the University of Leeds, where he studied the kinetics and reaction mechanisms of electron transfer processes in binuclear cobalt complexes.

== Independent career ==
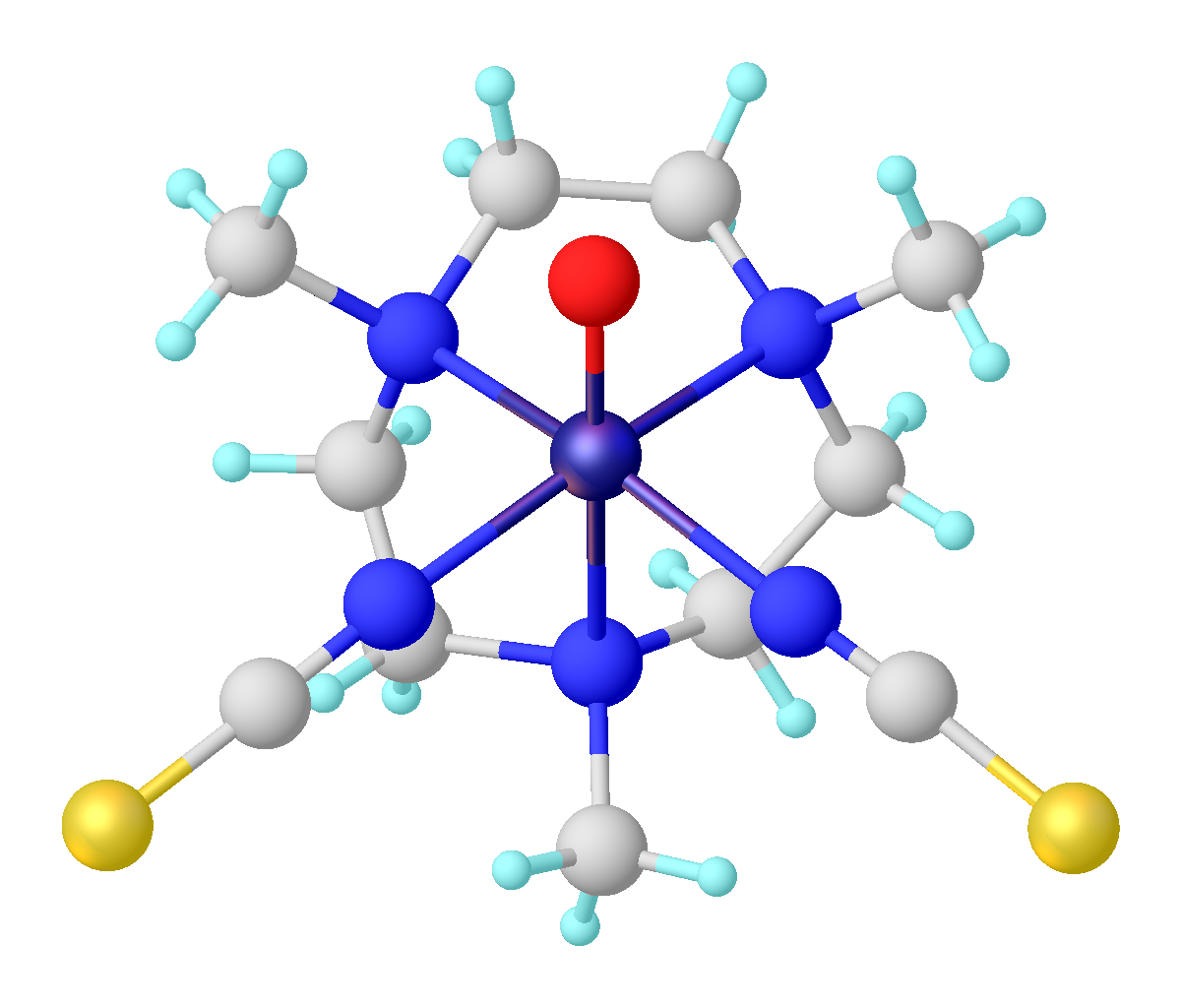
Structure of OTi(NCS)_{2}(Me_{3}tacn), first example of a titanyl complex as described by the Wieghardt group.

Wieghardt returned to Germany, and completed his habilitation at the University of Heidelberg in 1975 with a thesis on the structural chemistry and mechanistic investigations on polynuclear cobalt-amine complexes. At the end of 1975, he was hired as an associate professor at the Technical University of Hannover. His work there focused on the synthesis, reactions and reaction mechanisms of vanadium and molybdenum complexes with hydroxylamine and hydroxylamine derivatives as ligands. In 1981 he moved to the Ruhr University Bochum as professor. It was at this stage of his career that he expanded the size of his research group, and moved into the field of bioinorganic chemistry, synthesizing transition metal complexes that act as analogs for metalloprotein active sites. Wieghardt went on to popularize the utility of 1,4,7-triazacyclononane and its derivatives as ligands for biomimetic transition metal complexes. In 1994, he was appointed Director of the Max Planck Institute for Bioinorganic Chemistry. While at the Max Planck Institute, he developed a research program to study complexes of noninnocent ligands. Since 2010, he has been professor emeritus.

== Research highlights ==
- Coordination compounds with coordinated tyrosyl radicals as galactose oxidase mimics
- Double-exchange in a molecular diiron complex
- High-valent iron(V) and iron(VI) complexes

== Awards ==
- Gay-Lussac-Humboldt Prize (1995)
- Wilhelm Klemm Award from the German Chemical Society (2000)
- John C. Bailar Medal (2000)
- Centenary Prize of the Royal Society of Chemistry (2001)
- Ruhr Prize for Arts and Sciences (2005)
- ACS Award in Inorganic Chemistry (2006)
- Elected member of the German National Academy of Natural Sciences Leopoldina (2006)
