= Lubitz =

Lubitz is a German language habitational surname. Notable people with the name include:

- Andreas Lubitz (1987–2015), German pilot who crashed Germanwings Flight 9525
- Otto Ernst Lubitz (1896–1943), German screenwriter, film producer and production manager
- Wolfgang Lubitz (born 1949), German chemist and biophysicist
