= Xile Hu =

Chinese chemist specialized in catalysts

Professor Xile Hu
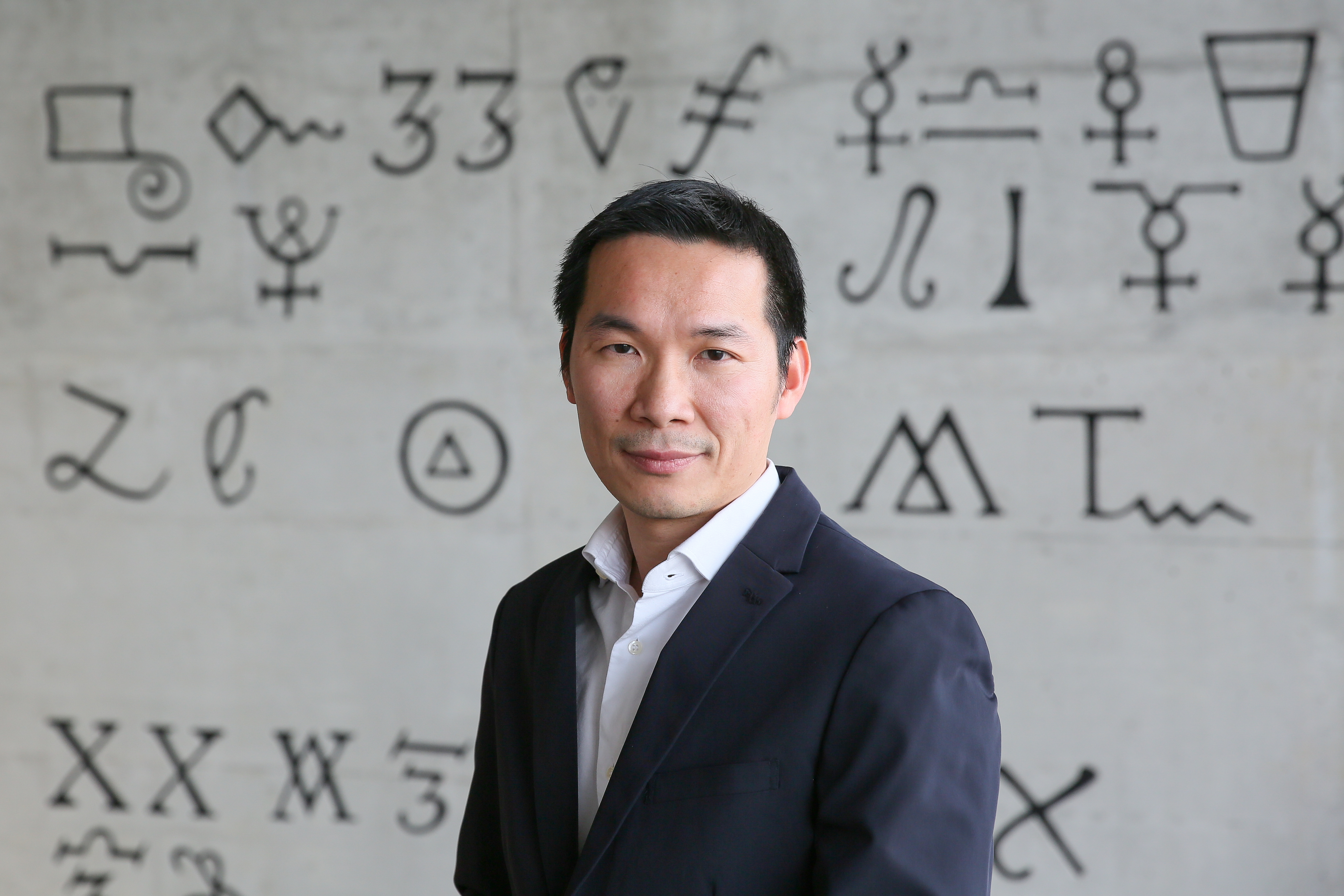
- Xile Hu in 2017
- Born: 1978 (age 47–48); Putian, China
- Awards: Bau Family Award in Inorganic Chemistry(2016); Swiss Science Prize Latsis (2017); Tajima Prize, International Society of Electrochemistry (2017); Caltech's Resonate Award of Sustainability Science (2018); RSC Homogeneous Catalysis Award (2019); International Catalysis Award (2020); Swiss Green & Sustainable Chemistry Award (2022); Robert K. Grasselli Award for Catalysis (2023); UPAC-Zhejiang NH International Award for Green Chemistry Experienced Chemist Award (2023); Highly Cited Researcher (2017-2024); Fellow, European Academy of Sciences(2019); Member, Academia Europaea (2020)

Academic background
- Education: Peking University; University of California, San Diego; California Institute of Technology
- Doctoral advisor: Karsten Meyer
- Other advisor: Jonas C. Peters

Academic work
- Discipline: Chemistry
- Sub-discipline: CatalysisElectrochemistry
- Institutions: École Polytechnique Fédérale de Lausanne (EPFL)
- Main interests: Biocatalysis; Electrocatalysis; Energy materials Membranes; Electrochemical energy conversion Synthetic methodology Homogeneous catalysis
- Website: https://www.epfl.ch/labs/lsci/

Xile Hu (born 1978 in Putian, China) is a Swiss chemist specialized in catalysis. He is a professor in chemistry at EPFL (École Polytechnique Fédérale de Lausanne) and leads the Laboratory of Inorganic Synthesis and Catalysis at the School of Basic Sciences.

== Career ==
Hu studied chemistry at Peking University and received his Bachelor’s degree in 2000. During his undergraduate, he worked with Jianhua Lin. He then joined the lab of Karsten Meyer at University of California, San Diego as PhD student and graduated with a thesis on "Metal complexes of tripodal N-heterocyclic carbene ligands: synthesis, structure, bonding, and reactivity." In 2005, he went to work as postdoctoral researcher with Jonas C. Peters at the California Institute of Technology. Here he initiated and developed a research project on molecular electrocatalysts for hydrogen evolution.

In 2007, he became tenure-track Assistant Professor of chemistry at EPFL. In 2013, he was promoted as Associate Professor, and in 2016, he became Full Professor at EPFL. Since 2007 he has led the Laboratory of Inorganic Synthesis and Catalysis at EPFL's School of Basic Sciences. In 2023 he co-founded a startup NovaMea, commercializing membranes, catalysts, and technologies for anion exchange membrane (AEM) water electrolysis.

== Research ==
Hu's research group directs an interdisciplinary research program to develop chemistry that has a potential societal impact, for example, more sustainable and efficient methods to make bio-active compounds, non-precious electrocatalysts and fluorine-free membranes for renewable energy conversion and storage, or improved electrochemical devices. Their research cover many aspects of inorganic, organic, bio, applied physical, and electrochemistry, as well as chemical engineering. They currently focus on (a) Biocatalysis for enantioselective organic synthesis, (b) Ion exchange membranes for energy devices, (c) Electrocatalysts for low-temperature water and CO_{2} electrolysis, (d) Electrocatalysts for high-temperature solid-oxide electrochemical cells, (e) Interfacial electrochemistry in membrane electrolyzers. Previously they had also worked in base metal catalyzed organic synthesis, fuel cell catalysis, and the development of synthetic models for the active site of metalloenzymes.

== Distinctions ==
In 2011, Hu won the Werner prize of the Swiss Chemical Society. In 2012 he was selected as an extraordinary young scientist by the world economic forum. In 2013, he received the Chemical Society Reviews Emerging Investigator Lectureship. In 2014, he won the European Medal for Bio-Inorganic Chemistry at the Eurobic conference. In 2015, he received the Young Researcher Award from the European Federation of Catalysis Societies. In 2016, he received the Bau Family Award in Inorganic Chemistry. In 2017, he was awarded with the National Latsis Prize by the Swiss National Science Foundation and the International Latsis Foundation, the Organic Letters Outstanding Publication of the Year Lectureship for 2017, and the Tajima Prize by the International Society of Electrochemistry. In 2018, he received the Resonate Award from Caltech, in 2019, the Homogeneous Catalysis Award by Royal Society of Chemistry, and in 2020, the International Catalysis Award by the International Association of Catalysis Societies. In 2022 he received Swiss Green & Sustainable Chemistry Award. In 2023 he received Robert K. Grasselli Award for Catalysis (European Federation of Catalysis Societies), and IUPAC-Zhejiang NH International Award for Green Chemistry Experienced Chemist Award. Hu has been named "Highly Cited Researcher" by Publons (Clarivate Analytics) every year from 2017 to current.

In 2014, he became a fellow of the Royal Society of Chemistry (UK), and in 2019 fellow of the European Academy of Sciences. Since 2020 he is a member of the Academia Europaea.
