= Rory Waterman (chemist) =

American chemist

Academic background
- Education: BS, 1999, University of Rochester; PhD, 2004, University of Chicago
- Thesis: The chemistry of three-coordinate nickel phosphinidene, imido, and carbene complexes (2004)
- Doctoral advisor: Gregory L. Hillhouse

Academic work
- Institutions: University of Vermont

Rory Waterman is an American chemist. He is a full professor and associate dean of inorganic, organometallic, and catalysis at the University of Vermont.

== Early life and education ==
Waterman attended the University of Rochester for his Bachelor of Science and the University of Chicago for his Ph.D. After completing his doctoral degree in 2004, he accepted a two-year Miller Research Fellowship at the University of California, Berkeley.

== Career ==
Waterman joined the University of Vermont's (UVM) college of arts and sciences as an assistant professor of chemistry in 2006. His research at UVM focuses on finding new ways to build chemical bonds, specifically in the chemical element Phosphorus. As a result of his research, he received the 2009 Alfred P. Sloan Award for outstanding early career scientists. Beyond this, Waterman also established research opportunities for Vermont high school and University of Vermont undergraduate students which resulted in him winning the 2009 Cottrell Scholar from the Research Corporation for Science Advancement.

In 2011, Waterman received funding from the National Science Foundation (NSF) and Major Research Instrumentation (MRI) grant program to purchase a single crystal XRD to collect structural data on crystalline solids. Following this, he was promoted to Associate Professor of Chemistry with Tenure. In this role, Waterman co-published Expanding the CURE Model: Course-Based Undergraduate Research Experience with Associate Professor Jennifer Heemstra in 2018. His research in the discovery and investigation of new catalysts and contributions as co-founder of the New Faculty Workshop were recognized with fellowships from the American Chemical Society, American Institute of Chemists, and Royal Society of Chemistry.

During the COVID-19 pandemic in North America, Waterman was the principal investigator on a grant aimed at improving diversity in science departments across academic institutions. He was also elected an Gund Institute for Environment Faculty Fellow.
