= Connie C. Lu =

Taiwanese-American inorganic chemist

- 盧之瑜
- Born: Connie Chih Lu
- Education: Massachusetts Institute of Technology B.S. (2000); California Institute of Technology Ph.D. (2006)
- Scientific career
- Fields: Inorganic chemistry, Organometallic chemistry, Catalysis
- Workplaces: University of Bonn (2022-present) University of Minnesota (2009-2022) Max Planck Institute for Bioinorganic Chemistry (2006-2009)
- Thesis: The Chemistry of Tris(phosphino)borate Manganese and Iron Platforms (2006)
- Doctoral advisor: Jonas C. Peters
- Other academic advisors: Karl Wieghardt
- Website: www.chemie.uni-bonn.de/lu/de

Connie C. Lu is a Taiwanese-American inorganic chemist and a professor of chemistry at the University of Bonn. She was previously a professor of chemistry at the University of Minnesota, Twin Cities. Lu's research focuses on the synthesis of novel bimetallic coordination complexes, as well as metal-organic frameworks. These molecules and materials are investigated for the catalytic conversion of small molecules like as N_{2} and CO_{2} into value-added chemicals like ammonia and methanol. Lu is the recipient of multiple awards for her research, including the National Science Foundation CAREER Award and the Sloan Research Fellowship in 2013, and an Early Career Award from the University of Minnesota's Initiative for Renewable Energy and the Environment in 2010.

== Early life and education ==
Lu grew up in Miami, Florida, the daughter of immigrants from Taiwan. She studied chemistry at the Massachusetts Institute of Technology, earning her B.S. in 2000. As an undergraduate, she conducted research under Prof. Vernon Ingram on peptides that ameliorate amyloid beta neurotoxicity.

She then went on to graduate studies at the California Institute of Technology, where she studied novel coordination chemistry and small molecule reactivity with Prof. Jonas C. Peters. Lu's doctoral work focused on the reactivity of zwitterionic palladium(II) complexes with CO, ethylene and amines, as well as tetrahedral manganese complexes and reductive cleavage of CO_{2} with an iron(I) complex. She earned her Ph.D. in 2006, with a thesis entitled The Chemistry of Tris(phosphino)borate Manganese and Iron Platforms.

Lu conducted postdoctoral studies at the Max Planck Institute for Bioinorganic Chemistry from 2006 to 2009, under the mentorship of Prof. Karl Wieghardt. Under Wieghardt, Lu studied first-row transition metal complexes synthesized with redox non-innocent α-iminopyridine ligands. Lu also reported the synthesis and characterization of a chromium iminyl radical complex, using the α-iminopyridine ligand system.

== Independent career ==
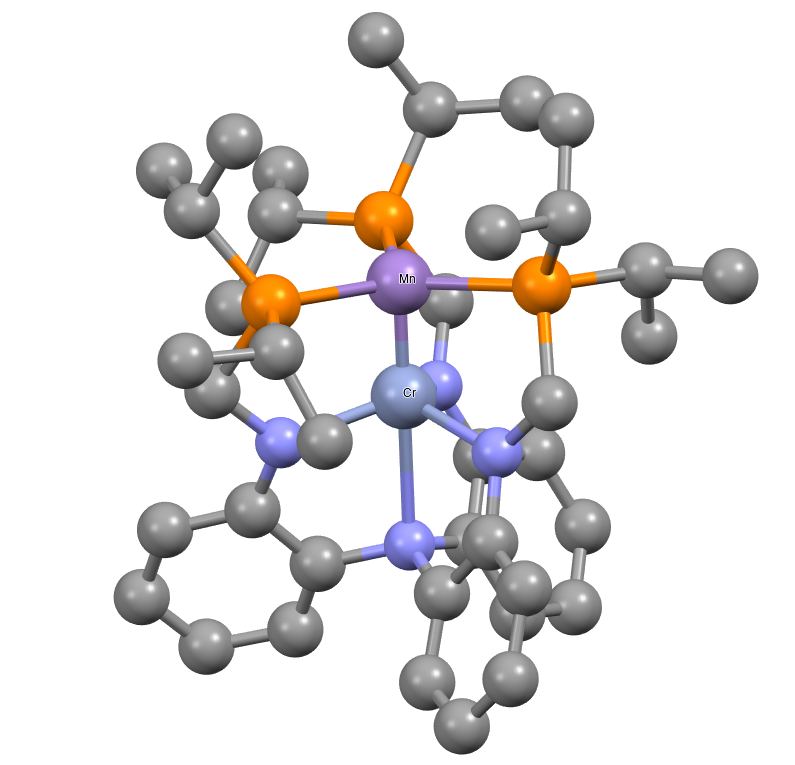
A heterobimetallic coordination complex prepared by Lu and coworkers, bearing a quintuple metal-metal bond, with Mn-Cr bond distance of 1.8192(9) Å.

In 2009, Lu began her independent career at the University of Minnesota, Twin Cities as an assistant professor in the department of chemistry. She was promoted to associate professor with tenure in 2015, and full professor in 2020. She moved her laboratory to the University of Bonn in 2022.

Her research focuses on the synthesis and characterization of bimetallic complexes, especially those that contain a metal-metal bond. The Lu group has developed a series of trianionic, tripodal ligands that can coordinate two metals at close proximity, allowing for the formation for a metal-metal bond in a coordination complex. The metal-metal bond order can range from bond orders of less than one to a quintuple bond, as between manganese and chromium in a complex reported in 2013, and between two chromium atoms in a complex reported in 2015.

These coordination complexes are also active for catalytic reactions of small molecules, such as the silylation of nitrogen by a dicobalt complex, and alkene hydrogenation by nickel-group 13 element complexes.

== Awards ==
Lu was named an Outstanding Reviewer of the journal Chemical Society Reviews in 2018 and 2019, featured in a 2018 JACS Young Investigators Virtual Issue, and named a Kavli Frontiers of Science Fellow in 2013. She has been honored with invited speaking engagements, as she gave a plenary lecture at a Royal Society of Chemistry Dalton Conference in 2018, and the Association for Cultural Diversity in Chemistry Lecture at the University of Pennsylvania in 2016. In 2017, Lu was invited to be a speaker at the Indo-US Workshop on Organometallic Chemistry and a Inorganic Chemistry Young Outstanding Upcoming speaker at Symposium on Advanced Biological Inorganic Chemistry in Kolkata, India.

== Memberships ==
Lu is a member of the American Chemical Society and the Royal Chemical Society, and has served on the editorial advisory board of Chemical Society Reviews since 2016. She also served on the Inorganic Chemistry editorial advisory board from 2016 to 2018.
