= Karsten Meyer =

Karsten Meyer may refer to:

- Karsten Meyer (sailor)
- Karsten Meyer (chemist)
