= Berben =

Berben is a surname. Notable people with the surname include:

- Geert Berben (born 1993), Belgian footballer
- Iris Berben (born 1950), German actress
- Louise Berben (fl. from 2000), Australian-American chemist
