= Barbara Burger =

American chemist

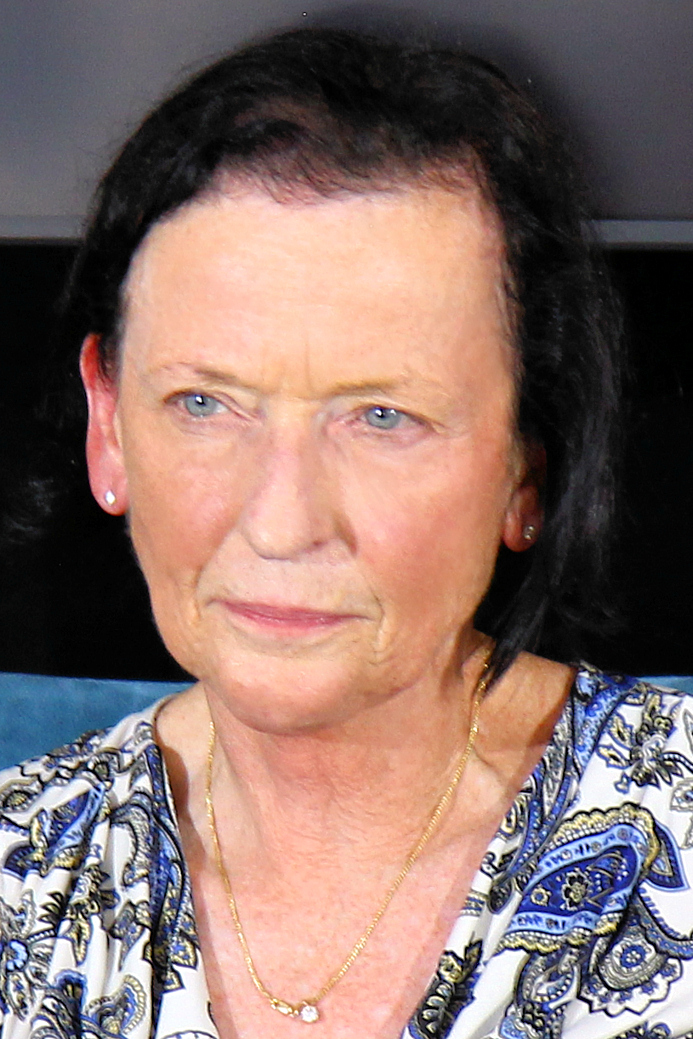
- Burger in 2023
- Education: University of California, Berkeley; University of Rochester; California Institute of Technology
- Scientific career
- Workplaces: Chevron Corporation
- Thesis: Olefin Insertion and β-Elimination Reactions of Permethylniobocene Olefin Hydride and Permethylscandocene Alkyl Complexes (1987)

Barbara Burger is an American chemist who is Energy Director and former President of Chevron Technology Ventures at Chevron Corporation. She was awarded the California Institute of Technology Alumni Award in 2021.

== Early life and education ==
Burger was an undergraduate student at the University of Rochester. She was a graduate student in chemistry at California Institute of Technology, and has a degree in business from University of California, Berkeley. Her doctoral research considered olefin insertion and β-Elimination reactions of permethylniobocene olefin hydride. She worked alongside John E. Bercaw, and Paul Chirik described her thesis as one of the "most influential in mechanistic organometallic chemistry". Here she co-authored Vacuum Line Techniques for Handling Air-sensitive Organometallic Compounds, which documented vacuum line techniques that enabled researchers to handle air sensitive organometallic compounds.

== Research and career ==
In 1987, Burger joined Chevron as a research chemist. She worked in industrial chemistry, and, in 2013, took on the role of President of Technology Ventures. In this capacity, she invested in over one hundred startups. Here she developed technologies to enhance the way that Chevron delivers energy, with a focus on decarbonisation.

Burger is on the external advisory council for the National Renewable Energy Laboratory, the Houston Symphony Society and the University of Rochester. At the University of Rochester, Burger donated $1 million to create the iZone, an innovation space for Rochester students. She eventually returned to California to establish at fellowship for women chemists to build careers outside of academia. She also funded the California Institute of Technology Women in Chemistry (WIC) program. She was awarded the Caltech Alumni Association award in 2021.

Burger retired from Chevron in 2021. She joined the Board of Directors of Heliogen, a renewable energy company, in 2022.

== Selected publications ==
- John E. Bercaw; Barbara J. Burger; Malcolm L. H. Green; Bernard D. Santarsiero; Andrea Sella; Mark S. Trimmer; Luet-Lok Wong (1989). "A new mechanism for exchange processes observed in the compounds [M(η-C5H5)2(exo-η-RCHCH2)H], M = Nb and Ta". Journal of the Chemical Society. Chemical communications (11): 734–736. doi:10.1039/c39890000734. ISSN 0022-4936. Wikidata Q60031619.
- Burger, Barbara J.; Thompson, Mark E.; Cotter, W. Donald; Bercaw, John E. (February 1990). "Ethylene insertion and .beta.-hydrogen elimination for permethylscandocene alkyl complexes. A study of the chain propagation and termination steps in Ziegler-Natta polymerization of ethylene". Journal of the American Chemical Society. 112 (4): 1566–1577. Bibcode:1990JAChS.112.1566B. doi:10.1021/ja00160a041. ISSN 0002-7863.
- Bunel, Emilio.; Burger, Barbara J.; Bercaw, John E. (1988-02-03). "Carbon-carbon bond activation via .beta.-alkyl elimination. Reversible branching of 1,4-pentadienes catalyzed by scandocene hydride derivatives". Journal of the American Chemical Society. 110 (3): 976–978. Bibcode:1988JAChS.110..976B. doi:10.1021/ja00211a053. ISSN 0002-7863.
