= Peter T. Wolczanski =

American professor of chemistry

- Born: August 28, 1954 (age 72); Utica, NY
- Education: Massachusetts Institute of Technology; California Institute of Technology
- Known for: Low-valent three-coordinate transition metal complexes Small molecule activation (most notably complete CO scission)
- Scientific career
- Fields: Inorganic and Organometallic Chemistry
- Workplaces: Cornell University
- Thesis: The reactivity and syntheses of mono and bis permethylcyclopentadienyl zirconium hydrides (1981)
- Doctoral advisor: John E. Bercaw
- Other academic advisors: Mark Wrighton
- Notable students: Christopher C. Cummins
- Website: wolczanski.chem.cornell.edu/pete/

Peter Thomas Wolczanski is the George W. and Grace L. Todd professor of Chemistry at Cornell University.

== Education ==
Wolczanski obtained his B.S. in Chemistry at the Massachusetts Institute of Technology in 1976 while doing research under the direction of Mark Wrighton. He entered graduate school at the California Institute of Technology, working under John Bercaw on various chemistries of permethylzirconocene hydrides and was awarded a doctorate degree in 1981.

== Awards and professional activities ==
- Fellow, American Academy of Arts and Sciences (1999)
- Casimir Funk Natural Science Award, Polish Institute of Arts & Sciences of America (1998)
- Alfred P. Sloan Foundation Fellow (1987–1989)
- J.S. Fluor Fellow (1980)
- 2011 ACS Award in Organometallic Chemistry
- Fellow, American Academy of Arts and Sciences (1999)
- Casimir Funk Natural Science Award, Polish Institute of Arts & Sciences of America (1998)
- Dow Chemical Co., Technical Advisory Boards (1996–2003 (Synthesis), 2006–2007
- Visiting Miller Research Professorship, Univ. California, Berkeley (1995)
- Fellow, Alfred P. Sloan Foundation (1987–1989)
- Union Carbide Innovation Recognition Program (1988)
- Chair, Organometallic Subdivision, ACS Division of Inorganic Chemistry (1994–1995)
- Executive Committee, ACS Division of Inorganic Chemistry (1991–1993)

== Selected publications ==
- "Carbon Monoxide Cleavage by (silox)_{3}Ta (silox = ^{t}Bu_{3}SiO-): Physical, Theoretical and Mechanistic Investigations." Neithamer, D.R.; LaPointe, R.E.; Wheeler, R.A.; Richeson, D.S.; Van Duyne, G.D.; Wolczanski, P.T. J. Am. Chem. Soc. 1989, 111, 9056–9072.
- "Symmetry and Geometry Considerations of Atom Transfer: Deoxygenation of (silox)_{3}WNO and R_{3}PO (R = Me, Ph, ^{t}Bu) by (silox)_{3}M (M = V, NbL (L = PMe_{3}, 4-picoline), Ta; silox = ^{t}Bu_{3}SiO)." Veige, A.S.; Slaughter, L. M.; Lobkovsky, E.B.; Wolczanski, P.T.; Matsunaga, N.; Decker, S.A.; Cundari, T. R. Inorg. Chem. 2003, 42, 6204–6224.
- "Thermodynamics, Kinetics and Mechanism of (silox)_{3}M(olefin) to (silox)_{3}M(alkylidene) Rearrangements (silox = ^{t}Bu_{3}SiO; M = Nb, Ta)." Hirsekorn, K.F.; Veige, A.S.; Marshak, M.P.; Koldobskaya, Y.; Wolczanski, P.T.; Cundari, T.R.; Lobkovsky, E.B. J. Am. Chem. Soc. 2005, 127, 4809–4830.
- "3-Center-4-Electron Bonding in [(silox)_{2}Mo=NR]_{2}(μ-Hg) Controls Reactivity while Frontier Orbitals Permit a Dimolybdenum π-Bond Energy Estimate." Rosenfeld, D.C.; Wolczanski, P.T.; Barakat, K.A.; Buda, C.; Cundari, T.R. J. Am. Chem. Soc. 2005, 127, 8262–8263.
- "PC Bond Cleavage of (silox)_{3}NbPMe_{3} (silox = ^{t}Bu_{3}SiO) under Dihydrogen Leads to (silox)_{3}Nb=CH_{2}, (silox)_{3}Nb=PH or (silox)_{3}NbP(H)Nb(silox)_{3}, and CH_{4}." Hirsekorn, K.F.; Veige, A.S.; Wolczanski, P.T. J. Am. Chem. Soc. 2006, 128, 2192–2193.
