= Ludwig Mond Award =

Award given by the Royal Society of Chemistry for contributions to inorganic chemistry

- Awarded for: Contributions to inorganic chemistry
- Sponsored by: Royal Society of Chemistry
- Date: 1981
- Country: United Kingdom (international)
- Reward(s): £2000

The Ludwig Mond Award is run annually by the Royal Society of Chemistry. The award is presented for outstanding research in any aspect of inorganic chemistry. The winner receives a monetary prize of £2000, in addition to a medal and a certificate, and completes a UK lecture tour. The winner is chosen by the Dalton Division Awards Committee.

In 2020 the Ludwig Mond Award was merged with the Nyholm Prize for Inorganic Chemistry to form the Mond-Nyholm Prize for Inorganic Chemistry.

== Award History ==
The award was established in 1981 to commemorate the life and work of the chemist Dr Ludwig Mond and followed an endowment from ICI (Imperial Chemical Industries). Mond was born in Kassel, Germany in 1839, and became a noted chemist and industrialist who eventually took British nationality.

== Recipients ==
- 1981: Sir Geoffrey Wilkinson
- 1983: F. Gordon A. Stone
- 1985: Sir Jack Lewis
- 1987: Donald Charlton Bradley
- 1989: Duward F. Shriver
- 1991: Norman N. Greenwood
- 1993: Bernard L. Shaw
- 1995: Hubert Schmidbaur
- 1997: Peter M. Maitlis
- 1999: Kenneth Wade
- 2001: Malcolm H. Chisholm
- 2003: John Forster Nixon
- 2005: Philip P. Power
- 2007: David Garner
- 2008: Robert H. Crabtree, Yale University
- 2009: Christopher Pickett, University of East Anglia
- 2010: Dermot O'Hare, University of Oxford
- 2011: David Parker, Durham University
- 2012: Douglas Stephan, University of Toronto
- 2013: Christopher Cummins, Massachusetts Institute of Technology
- 2014: Gerard Parkin, Columbia University
- 2015: Vivian Yam, The University of Hong Kong
- 2016: Richard Winpenny, University of Manchester
- 2017: Karsten Meyer, Friedrich-Alexander-University Erlangen-Nürnberg (FAU)
- 2018: Warren Piers, University of Calgary
- 2019: Stuart Macgregor (scientist), Heriot-Watt University
- 2020: Jeffrey Long, University of California, Berkeley
- 2021: Holger Braunschweig, University of Würzburg
- 2022: Jonathan Sessler, The University of Texas at Austin
- 2023: Eduardo Peris, Universitat Jaume
- 2024: Euan Brechin, University of Edinburgh

== See also ==
- List of chemistry awards
