= John E. Bercaw =

American chemist (born 1944)

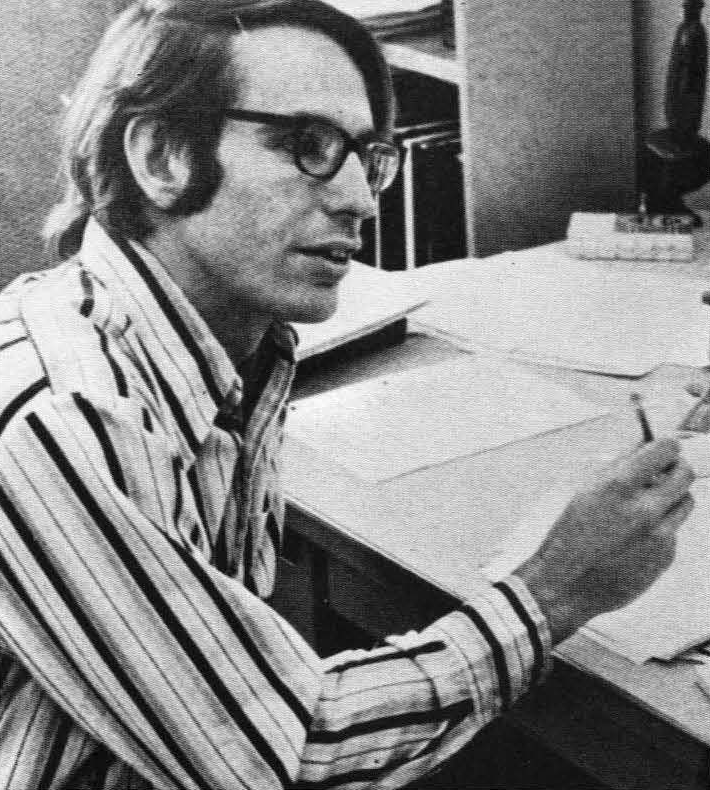
- Bercaw in 1986
- Born: December 3, 1944 (age 81); Cincinnati, Ohio
- Education: North Carolina State University, BS; University of Michigan, PhD
- Known for: Metallocene chemistry
- Awards: 1980 ACS Award in Pure Chemistry
- Scientific career
- Fields: Chemistry
- Workplaces: California Institute of Technology
- Thesis: Titanocene as a reactive intermediate in the reduction of molecular hydrogen and nitrogen (1971)
- Doctoral advisor: Hans-Herbert Brintzinger
- Other academic advisors: Jack Halpern
- Doctoral students: Peter T. Wolczanski, Paul Chirik, Barbara Burger
- Other notable students: Don Tilley, Gregory L. Hillhouse, Gerard Parkin, Christopher W. Jones, Guillermo Bazan
- Website: www.cce.caltech.edu/content/john-e-bercaw

John E. Bercaw (born December 3, 1944) is an American chemist and Centennial Professor of Chemistry, Emeritus at the California Institute of Technology.

== Early life and education ==
Born on December 3, 1944 in Cincinnati, Ohio, Bercaw obtained his bachelor of science in 1967 from North Carolina State University and later his PhD from the University of Michigan in 1971 under the direction of Hans-Herbert Brintzinger, followed by postdoctoral research with Jack Halpern at the University of Chicago.

== Career ==
He joined the faculty at the Caltech in 1972. Bercaw was elected a Fellow of the American Academy of Arts and Sciences in 1991.

He is a member of the National Academy of Sciences (elected 1990), and he has received several national awards from the American Chemical Society (see below).

His research interests are in synthetic, structural and mechanistic organotransition metal chemistry, including most recently catalysts for polymerization and trimerization of olefins and investigations of hydrocarbon hydroxylation; fundamental transformations and thermodynamics of organotransition metal chemistry; catalysts for hydrocarbon partial oxidation; catalysts for olefin trimerization and polymerization; homogeneous transformations of carbon monoxide and dihydrogen to fuels and chemicals.

Prof. Bercaw has greatly enhanced understanding of the mechanisms of Ziegler-Natta (ZN) olefin polymerizations. This metal-catalyzed polymerization process is operated on a vast scale and produces, worldwide, over 200 billion pounds of polyolefins per year. Bercaw’s work has led to an understanding of the mechanisms of chain growth in ZN polymerizations and the factors which control syndio- and isotacticities and the degree of comonomer incorporation in copolymerizations; these variables are critical in determining the physical properties of the resultant polymers and copolymers.

Commercial processes have been based on Bercaw’s discoveries. For example, new and superior ethylene/alpha-olefin copolymers are now industrially produced with titanium catalysts utilizing (η^{5}- C_{5}Me_{4})SiMe_{2}NCMe_{3} and related ligands devised in Bercaw’s laboratories. These copolymers have proved to have superior properties. These types of systems have also allowed superior methods for production of ethylene/propylene and ethylene/propylene/diene elastomers.

== Awards ==
Year	Awards
1980	ACS Award in Pure Chemistry
1990	ACS Award in Organometallic Chemistry
1997	ACS Award for Distinguished Service in the Advancement of Inorganic Chemistry
1999	ACS George A. Olah Award in Hydrocarbon or Petroleum Chemistry
1999	American Institute of Chemists Chemical Pioneer Award
2000	ACS Arthur C. Cope Scholar Award
2005	Northwestern University - Chemistry Department's Basolo Medal
2008	University of Chicago Chemistry Department Closs Lecturer
2013	Southern California Section of the ACS Tolman Medal
2014	Willard Gibbs Award
2017	Gabor A. Somorjai Award for Creative Research in Catalysis
