= Don Tilley =

American inorganic chemist

- Born: November 22, 1954 (age 71); Norman, Oklahoma
- Education: University of Texas BS (1977); University of California, Berkeley PhD (1977)
- Spouse: Rosemary Tilley
- Scientific career
- Fields: Inorganic Chemistry, Organometallic Chemistry
- Workplaces: University of California, Berkeley
- Doctoral advisor: Richard A. Andersen
- Other academic advisors: Robert H. Grubbs, John E. Bercaw, Luigi Venanzi, Piero Pino
- Notable students: Laurel Schafer (postdoc), Jonas C. Peters (postdoc)
- Website: www.cchem.berkeley.edu/tdtgroup/

T. Don Tilley (born in Norman, Oklahoma, November 22, 1954) is a professor of chemistry at the University of California, Berkeley.

== Career ==
In 1977, Tilley received his B.S. degree in chemistry from the University of Texas. In 1982, he earned his Ph.D. degree from the University of California, Berkeley for his research on organolanthanide chemistry with Professor Richard A. Andersen.

Afterwards, he conducted post-doctoral research with Prof. Robert H. Grubbs and Prof. John E. Bercaw at the California Institute of Technology and with Luigi Venanzi and Piero Pino at ETH in Switzerland, during which he developed the chemistry of the (pentamethylcyclopentadienyl)ruthenium fragment ([Cp*Ru]).

He started his independent research career at UC San Diego in 1983, where he was promoted to associate professor in 1988, and to Professor in 1990. In 1994, he accepted appointments as a professor of chemistry at UC Berkeley and Faculty Senior Scientist at the Lawrence Berkeley National Laboratory (LBNL).

Throughout his career, he has published over 430 papers on various subjects in organometallic and inorganic chemistry, as well as materials science. Since 2005, Tilley has also served as the North American Associate Editor for Chemical Communications.

== Research ==
Tilley's research group conducts exploratory synthetic, structural, and reactivity studies of inorganic and organometallic systems. His research program includes: organometallic chemistry and homogenous catalysis, materials chemistry and heterogenous catalysis, organic electronic materials, supramolecular chemistry, and solar energy conversion.

== Awards and honors ==
- Alfred P. Sloan Fellowship (1988)
- Union Carbide Innovation Recognition Award (1991–92)
- Japan Society for the Promotion of Science Fellowship (1993)
- Alexander von Humboldt Award for Senior Scientists (1998)
- Fellow, American Association for the Advancement of Science (1998)
- ACS Award in Organometallic Chemistry (2002)
- Wacker Silicon Award (2003)
- Centenary Lectureship and Medal of the Royal Society (2007-8)
- CS Frederic Stanley Kipping Award in Silicon Chemistry (2008)
- Fellow, American Academy of Arts and Sciences (2013)
- Edward Mack, Jr. Lecture, OSU (2013)
- ACS Award for Distinguished Service in the Advancement of Inorganic Chemistry (2014)
- American Chemical Society Fellow (2014)

== Major publications ==
- Lipke, M.C.; Liberman-Martin, A.; Tilley, T.D.. "Electrophilic Activation of Silicon–Hydrogen Bonds in Catalytic Hydrosilations." Ang. Chem. Int. Ed. 56.9 (2017): 2260–2294.
- Nguyen, A.I.; Ziegler, M.S.; Oña-Burgos, P.; Sturzbecher-Hohne, M.; Kim, W.; Bellone, D. E.; and Tilley, T.D. "Mechanistic Investigation of Water Oxidation by a Molecular Cobalt Oxide Analogue: Evidence for a Highly Oxidized Intermediate and Exclusive Terminal Oxo Participation." J. Am. Chem. Soc. 137.40 (2015): 12865–12872.
- Gessner, V.H.; Tannaci, J.F; Miller, A.D; and Tilley, T.D. "Assembly of Macrocycles by Zirconocene-Mediated, Reversible Carbon−Carbon Bond Formation." Acc. Chem. Res. 44.6 (2011): 435–446.
- Sadow, A.D., and Tilley, T.D. "Homogeneous Catalysis with Methane. A Strategy for the Hydromethylation of Olefins Based on the Nondegenerate Exchange of Alkyl Groups and σ-Bond Metathesis at Scandium." J. Am. Chem. Soc. 125.26 (2003): 7971-7977
- Waterman, R.; Hayes, P.G. and Tilley, T.D. "Synthetic Development and Chemical Reactivity of Transition-Metal Silylene Complexes." Acc. Chem. Res. 40.8 (2007): 712–719.
- Tilley, T.D. "The Coordination Polymerization of Silanes to Polysilanes by a "σ-Bond Metathesis" Mechanism. Implications for Linear Chain Growth."Acc. Chem. Res. 26.1 (1993): 22–29.
- Tilley, T.D., Grubbs, R.H., Bercaw, J.E. "Halide, hydride, and alkyl derivatives of (pentamethylcyclopentadienyl)bis(trimethylphosphine)ruthenium." Organometallics, 3.2 (1984): 274–278.
