= Willi A. Kalender =

German medical physicist (1949–2024)

Willi A. Kalender (1 August 1949 – 20 October 2024) was a German medical physicist and professor and former chairman of the Institute of Medical Physics of the University of Erlangen-Nuremberg. Kalender has produced several new technologies in the field of diagnostic radiology imaging.

Kalender was a Fellow of the American Association of Physicists in Medicine (AAPM) and Honorary Fellow of the British Institute of Radiology (BIR) and of the Institute of Physics and Engineering in Medicine (IPEM). Kalender was also elected a member of the National Academy of Engineering (2016) for the development of spiral computed tomography methods that enable modern high-speed 3D medical imaging with X-rays.

== Education ==
Kalender started his studies in physics and mathematics at the University of Bonn, Germany. He completed his master's and Ph.D. degree in medical physics at the University of Wisconsin in 1974 and 1979, respectively. In 1988 he completed all postdoctoral lecturing qualifications (Habilitation) at the University of Tübingen, Germany. In order to get a better grasp of the subject, he took and successfully completed all courses in the pre-clinical medicine curriculum.

== Career ==
From 1979 to 1995 Kalender worked in the research laboratories of Siemens Medical Systems in Erlangen, Germany; he was appointed head of the Medical Physics group in 1988. In 1991 he became Adjunct Associate Professor of Medical Physics at the University of Wisconsin. In 1995 he was appointed full professor and chairman of the newly established Institute of Medical Physics at the Friedrich-Alexander University Erlangen-Nuremberg, Germany. In 1999 he became distinguished visiting professor to the Department of Radiology at Stanford University.

== Death ==
Kalender died on 20 October 2024, at the age of 75.

== Research and development achievements ==
Kalender conducted research mainly in the area of diagnostic radiology imaging with a clear focus on special CT applications. The goals of and motivation for his projects were mostly derived from observations during patient exams in clinical radiology.

Kalender was involved in the development of the world's first product options for dual-energy CT [1] in 1983 and for metal artifact reduction (MAR) in 1987.

Kalender developed volumetric spiral computed tomography; the world's first clinical spiral CT studies were presented at RSNA 1989. The combination of continuous data acquisition with slip-ring-based data transmission and continuous table translation led to considerable reduction of examination times, to an essential reduction of motion artifacts and image quality significantly improved by providing isotropic spatial resolution as a decisive feature.

Kalender developed angio-CT [4] and heart phase-specific cardiac imaging.

Other highly important fields of W. Kalender's research have been radiation protection and the development of intelligent and very efficient dose reduction approaches such as tube current modulation [7] and the optimization of the choice of x-ray spectra. They allow reducing the patient dose by an order of magnitude in many cases without impairing image quality.

From 2008 to 2019 Kalender's research was focused on the development of an efficient breast-CT system to improve the early detection of breast cancer. The scanner and in particular the development of its high-resolution photon-counting detector design allow scanning the breast with a dose similar to that of digital mammography, but with much higher resolution and clarity than mammography due to superposition-free fully 3D-resolution of breast-CT. The introduction into clinical practice was performed in 2018 at the University Spital Zurich (Swiss).

Kalender founded several university spinoff companies to transfer scientific results into products and small business.

== Selected honours and awards ==
- 2002 FAAPM, Honorary Fellowship of the American Association of Physicists in Medicine (AAPM)
- 2004 Cross of the Order of Merit of the Federal Republic of Germany
- 2007 European Latsis Prize 2007 by the European Science Foundation (ESF)
- 2008 Roentgen-Plakette by the City of Remscheid Germany
- 2009 Dr. med. h. c. (honorary doctoral degree in medicine) awarded by RWTH Aachen, Germany
- 2009 Honorary Membership of the European Society of Radiology (ESR)
- 2009 Elected member of the German Academy of Sciences Leopoldina
- 2009 William D. Coolidge Award by the American Association of Physicists in Medicine (AAPM)
- 2010 Ziedses des Plantes-Medaille by the German Society of Neuroradiology
- 2011 Dr. med. h. c. (honorary doctoral degree in medicine) awarded by the University of Zurich, CH
- 2012 FBIR, Honorary Fellowship of the British Institute of Radiology (BIR), UK
- 2016 Elected Member of the National Academy of Engineering (NAE), USA
- 2018 First recipient of the Gary Glazer Prize, 10. Int. CT Symposium Garmisch-Partenkirchen, Germany

== Publications ==
Kalender authored 963 publications, including 286 original scientific papers; his Hirsch-index is cited with a 69 (ISI-Web of Knowledge, 2018).

== Sources ==
[1] Kalender WA, Klotz E, Süß C. An integral approach to vertebral bone mineral analysis by X-ray computed tomography. Radiology 1987; 164:419-423

=== Further reading ===
- Kalender, Willi A. (7 July 2011). Computed Tomography: Fundamentals, System Technology, Image Quality, Applications. John Wiley & Sons. ISBN 978-3-89578-644-0.
- Kalender, W A (December 1995). "Thin-section three-dimensional spiral CT: is isotropic imaging possible?". Radiology. 197 (3): 578–580. doi:10.1148/radiology.197.3.7480719. ISSN 0033-8419. PMID 7480719.
- Bautz, W; Strotzer, M; Lenz, M; Dittler, HJ; Kalender, WA (1991). "Preoperative evaluation of the vessels of the upper abdomen with spiral CT: Comparison with conventional CT and arterial DXA". Radiology. 181 (P): 261.
- Kalender, Willi A.; Wolf, Heiko; Suess, Christoph; Gies, Michael; Greess, Holger; Bautz, Werner A. (1 February 1999). "Dose reduction in CT by on-line tube current control: principles and validation on phantoms and cadavers". European Radiology. 9 (2): 323–328. doi:10.1007/s003300050674. ISSN 1432-1084. PMID 10101657.
- Kalender, Willi A.; Deak, Paul; Kellermeier, Markus; van Straten, Marcel; Vollmar, Sabrina V. (March 2009). "Application- and patient size-dependent optimization of x-ray spectra for CT". Medical Physics. 36 (3): 993–1007. Bibcode:2009MedPh..36..993K. doi:10.1118/1.3075901. ISSN 0094-2405. PMID 19378760.
- Kalender, Willi A (7 February 2014). "Dose in x-ray computed tomography". Physics in Medicine and Biology. 59 (3): R129 – R150. Bibcode:2014PMB....59R.129K. doi:10.1088/0031-9155/59/3/R129. PMID 24434792.
