= Jonas C. Peters =

American inorganic chemist

- Born: 1971 (age 54–55); Chicago, Illinois
- Education: University of Chicago (B.S.) (1993); Massachusetts Institute of Technology (Ph.D) (1998)
- Scientific career
- Fields: Inorganic Chemistry
- Workplaces: California Institute of Technology
- Thesis: Small molecule chemistry of molybdenum and titanium tris amido complexes (1998)
- Doctoral advisor: Christopher C. Cummins
- Other academic advisors: Gregory L. Hillhouse, James J. Turner, T. Don Tilley
- Doctoral students: Connie C. Lu
- Other notable students: Brandi Cossairt (undergraduate), Xile Hu (postdoc), Louise Berben
- Website: jcpgroup.caltech.edu

Jonas C. Peters (born 1971 in Chicago, Illinois) is the Bren Professor of Chemistry at the California Institute of Technology and Director of the Resnick Sustainability Institute. He has contributed to the development of catalysts and photocatalysts relevant to small molecule activation. In 2026, he was elected to the American Philosophical Society.

== Early life and education ==
Peters was born in 1971 in Chicago, Illinois. He received his Bachelor of Sciences from the University of Chicago in Chemistry in 1993. While an undergraduate student, he worked under Gregory L. Hillhouse on synthetic methods in inorganic chemistry, specifically with regard to the stabilization of reactive species including diazene and nitroxyl. Following his undergraduate, Peters spent a year as a Marshall Scholar at the University of Nottingham working with James J. Turner, FRS. There, he studied physical inorganic chemistry including the photochemical generation and detection of short-lived transient organometallic species by rapid time-resolved infrared spectroscopy.

In fall of 1994, Peters went on to do graduate studies with Christopher "Kit" C. Cummins at the Massachusetts Institute of Technology. At MIT, he studied the activation and functionalization of small molecules using low coordinate tris-amido molybdenum and titanium complexes and prepared the first terminal carbide complex of a transition metal, earning his PhD in 1998.

After graduating, Peters conducted postdoctoral studies as a Miller Fellow at the University of California, Berkeley, under the guidance of T. Don Tilley. In Tilley's group, he concentrated on the synthesis and employment of novel phosphine and silane ligands relevant to late metal Si-C, Si-H, C-H, and C-C bond breaking and forming processes.

== Independent career ==
Peters began as assistant professor in the Division of Chemistry and Chemical Engineering at Caltech in August 1999, was promoted to associate professor in 2004, and to Professor of Chemistry in 2006. In July 2007, he relocated to the MIT Department of Chemistry as the W. M. Keck Professor of Energy. Peters returned to Caltech in January 2010 as Bren Professor of Chemistry and in 2015 he was appointed Director of the Resnick Sustainability Institute.

Peters' laboratory focuses on the synthesis of new inorganic and organometallic species with interesting electronic structure, bonding, and reactivity properties. His laboratory has advanced new concepts for catalysis (including electro- and photocatalysis), with significance to renewable solar fuel technologies, distributed nitrogen fixation for fertilizers and fuels, and chemical transformations fundamental to the synthesis of organic molecules. Peters' research studies are mechanistic in nature and include the characterization of highly reactive species that populate open-shell ground spin states amenable to spectroscopic characterization. He collaborates with many talented scientists, including Gregory Fu on methodology in organic synthesis. In 2021, he was elected to the American Academy of Arts and Sciences, in 2024 to the National Academy of Sciences, and in 2026 to the American Philosophical Society.
