= Rainer Bauböck =

Austrian sociologist, political scientist and migration researcher

- Born: 15 March 1953 (age 73); Ried im Innkreis, Austria
- Occupations: Part time professor at the European University Institute and Chair of the Commission for Migration and Integration Research of the Austrian Academy of Sciences, Vienna
- Awards: European Latsis Prize

Academic background
- Education: University of Vienna

Academic work
- Discipline: Political Science, Sociology, and Psychology
- Website: https://globalcit.eu/team/bauboeck-rainer/

Rainer Bauböck (born 15 March 1953 in Ried im Innkreis) is an Austrian sociologist, political scientist and migration researcher. Bauböck is a former Chair in Social and Political theory at the European University Institute in Florence, Italy, part time professor in the Global Governance Programme of the Robert Schuman Centre for Advanced Studies at the European University Institute and Chair of the Commission for Migration and Integration Research of the Austrian Academy of Sciences, Vienna.

== Career ==
Bauböck received his Ph.D. from the University of Vienna where he studied sociology and psychology graduating in 1977 with his thesis Housing Policy in Social-Democratic Vienna 1919-1934. For the next two years he did postgraduate studies in political science at the Institute for Advanced Studies before completing his habilitation in Innsbruck with a thesis on transnational citizenship. From 1986 to 1999, Bauböck conducted research and taught at the Institute of Advanced Studies.

He was a visiting professor and a visiting scholar at the Bellagio Rockefeller Foundation (2006), Yale University (2005), the University of Pompeu Fabra in Barcelona (2003), the University of Bristol (2002), University of Malmö (2000-2001); the Institute for Advanced Study, Princeton and Princeton University (1998-1999); and the University of Warwick (1990-1991). He is a recurrent guest professor at the Central European University in Budapest and has also taught frequently at the Universities of Vienna and Innsbruck.

Bauböck was President of the Austrian Political Science Association from 2003 to 2005 and in 2006 received the Latsis Prize of the European Science Foundation for his research on migration and social cohesion.

He has been a corresponding member abroad of the Austrian Academy of Sciences since 2013. He also received an honorary doctorate from the University of Malmö in 2013. He is currently a part time professor in the Global Governance Programme of the Robert Schuman Centre for Advanced Studies at the European University Institute and chair of the Commission for Migration and Integration Research of the Austrian Academy of Sciences, Vienna.

Bauböck research focuses on normative political theory and comparative research on democratic citizenship, European integration, migration, nationalism and minority rights.

== Selected publications ==
- Bauböck, R. (ed.), Debating European Citizenship, Springer, 2018
- Bauböck, R. (ed.), Debating Transformations of National Citizenship, Springer, 2018
- Democratic inclusion : Rainer Bauböck in dialogue, Manchester : Manchester University Press, 2017
- Shachar, A., Bauböck, R., Bloemraad, I., Vink, M. P. (eds.), The Oxford handbook of citizenship, Oxford : Oxford University Press, 2017
- Transnational Citizenship. Membership and Rights in International Migration, Aldershot : Edward Elgar, 1994
