= Linus Pauling Award =

Chemistry award

The Linus Pauling Award is an award recognizing outstanding achievement in chemistry. It is awarded annually by the Puget Sound, Oregon, and Portland sections of the American Chemical Society, and is named after the US chemist Linus Pauling (1901–1994), to whom it was first awarded in 1966.

Another Linus Pauling Award is given annually by the Chemistry Department at Buffalo State College.

== Oregon Laureates ==
Source: ACS

- 1966 – Linus Pauling
- 1967 – Manfred Eigen
- 1968 – Herbert C. Brown
- 1969 – Henry Eyring
- 1970 – Harold C. Urey
- 1971 – Gerhard Herzberg
- 1972 – E. Bright Wilson
- 1973 – E. J. Corey
- 1974 – Roald Hoffmann
- 1975 – Paul Doughty Bartlett
- 1976 – F. Albert Cotton
- 1977 – John A. Pople
- 1978 – Dudley Herschbach
- 1979 – Daniel E. Koshland
- 1980 – John D. Roberts
- 1981 – Henry Taube
- 1982 – George C. Pimentel
- 1983 – Gilbert Stork
- 1984 – John S. Waugh
- 1985 – Harold A. Scheraga
- 1986 – Harry B. Gray
- 1987 – Harden M. McConnell
- 1988 – Keith Ingold
- 1989 – Neil Bartlett
- 1990 – James P. Collman
- 1991 – Rudolph Marcus
- 1992 – Kenneth B. Wiberg
- 1993 – Richard N. Zare
- 1994 – James A. Ibers
- 1995 – Alexander Rich
- 1996 – Kyriacos C. Nicolaou
- 1997 – Ahmed H. Zewail
- 1998 – Allen J. Bard
- 1999 – Peter B. Dervan
- 2000 – Gabor A. Somorjai
- 2001 – Tobin J. Marks
- 2002 – John I. Brauman
- 2003 – Robert H. Grubbs
- 2004 – Martin Karplus
- 2005 – George Whitesides
- 2006 – Peter J. Stang
- 2007 – Jacqueline K. Barton
- 2008 – Thomas C. Bruice
- 2009 – Stephen J. Lippard
- 2010 – Armand Paul Alivisatos
- 2011 – Larry R. Dalton
- 2012 – Robert Cava
- 2013 – Chad Mirkin
- 2014 – Stephen Buchwald
- 2015 – Barry M. Trost
- 2016 – Timothy M. Swager
- 2017 – Christopher C. Cummins
- 2018 – Geraldine Richmond
- 2019 – Catherine Murphy
- 2020 – Paul Chirik
- 2021 – No Medal Awarded (COVID)
- 2022 – Cynthia J. Burrows
- 2023 – Laura Gagliardi
- 2024 – Younan Xia
- 2025 – Joseph S. Francisco

== See also ==
- List of chemistry awards

== Sources ==
- Linus Pauling Medalists, Portland State University Chemistry Department
- Linus Pauling Award, Buffalo State University Chemistry Department
- Linus Pauling Award, University Washington
- Linus Pauling Medal Award 2010
- Linus Pauling Award 2011
- Linus Pauling Award 2018
