= F. Gordon A. Stone =

British chemist

- Royal Society Photo, 1977
- Born: 19 May 1925; Exeter, Devon, UK
- Died: 6 April 2011 (aged 85); Waco, Texas, USA
- Education: Christ's College, Cambridge
- Awards: Ludwig Mond Award (1983); Davy Medal (1989)
- Scientific career
- Workplaces: Bristol University, Baylor University
- Doctoral advisor: Emeléus

Francis Gordon Albert Stone CBE, FRS, FRSC (19 May 1925 – 6 April 2011), always known as Gordon, was a British chemist who was a prolific and decorated scholar. He specialized in the synthesis of main group and transition metal organometallic compounds. He was the author of more than 900 academic publications resulting in an h-index of 72 in 2011.

== Early life ==
Gordon Stone was born in Exeter, Devon in 1925, the only child of Sidney Charles Stone, a civil servant, and Florence Beatrice Stone (née Coles). He received his B.A. in 1948 and Ph.D. in 1951, both from Christ's College, Cambridge (Cambridge University), England, where he studied under Harry Julius Emeléus.

== Academic life ==
After graduating from Cambridge, he was a Fulbright Scholar at the University of Southern California for two years, before being appointed as an instructor in the Chemistry Department at Harvard University, and was appointed assistant professor in 1957. He was the Robert A. Welch Distinguished Professor of Chemistry at Baylor University, Texas until 2010, but his most productive period was as Professor of Inorganic Chemistry at Bristol University, England (1963–1990), where he published hundreds of papers over the course of 27 years. In research he competed with his contemporary Geoffrey Wilkinson.

Elected to the Royal Society of Chemistry in 1970, and to the Royal Society in 1976, he was awarded the Davy Medal "In recognition of his many distinguished contributions to organometallic chemistry, including the discovery that species containing carbon-metal of metal-metal multiple bonds are versatile reagents for synthesis of cluster compounds with bonds between different transition elements" in 1989.

Among the many foci of his studies were complexes of fluorocarbon, isocyanide, polyolefin, alkylidene and alkylidyne ligands. At Baylor, he maintained a research program on boron hydrides, a lifelong interest.

In 1988 he chaired the Review Committee commissioned by the British Government (the now-dissolved University Grants Committee) to carry out a review of chemistry in UK academia ("University Chemistry — The Way Forward", "The Stone Report"). His main recommendation, "that the UGC [...] fund properly not fewer than 30 chemistry departments" and that "at least 20 of these departments have 30 or more academic staff [...] to compete successfully at the international level" was never implemented.

His autobiography Leaving No Stone Unturned, Pathways in Organometallic Chemistry, was published in 1993. With Wilkinson, he edited the influential series Comprehensive Organometallic Chemistry. With Robert West, he edited the series Advances in Organometallic Chemistry.

The Gordon Stone Lecture series at the University of Bristol is named in his honour.

Annual Stone Symposiums are also held at Baylor University in his honor.

== Awards ==
- Fellow of the Royal Society of Chemistry (1970)
- Fellow of the Royal Society (1976), Vice-President 1987-1988
- Chugaev Medal of the Kurnakov Institute (Russian Academy of Sciences) (1978)
- Royal Society of Chemistry’s Ludwig Mond Award (1983)
- American Chemical Society’s award in Inorganic Chemistry (1985)
- Royal Society of Chemistry’s Sir Edward Frankland Prize Lectureship (1988)
- Royal Society's Davy Medal (1989)
- Royal Society of Chemistry’s Longstaff Prize (1990)
- Commander of the Order of the British Empire (1990)

== Personal life ==
He married Judith Hislop (1928-2008) of Sydney, Australia in 1956 with whom he had three sons.
