= Brandi Cossairt =

American chemist (b. 1984)

Brandi Michelle Cossairt
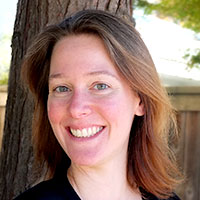
- Cossairt in September 2016
- Born: June 29, 1984 (age 42); Miami, Florida
- Education: B.S. - California Institute of Technology, 2002 - 2006; Ph.D. - Massachusetts Institute of Technology, 2006 - 2010; Postdoctoral Fellow - Columbia University, 2010 - 2012
- Awards: 2018 National Fresenius Award; 2016 NSF CAREER award; 2015 Packard Fellowship for Science and Engineering; 2015 Sloan Research Fellowship; Seattle AWIS "Early Career Achievement" Award; 3M Non-Tenured Faculty Award
- Scientific career
- Fields: Synthetic Inorganic Chemistry
- Workplaces: University of Washington
- Thesis: Niobium-mediated synthesis of phosphorus-rich molecules (2010)
- Doctoral advisor: Christopher C. Cummins
- Other academic advisors: Jonas C. Peters (B.S.); Jonathan S. Owen (Post-Doc)
- Website: brandicossairt.wixsite.com/cossairtlab

Brandi Michelle Cossairt (born June 29, 1984) is an American chemist specializing in synthetic inorganic and materials chemistry. She is the Lloyd E. and Florence M. West Endowed Professor of Chemistry at University of Washington.

== Personal life and education ==
Brandi Cossairt was born and raised in Miami, Florida. She began working in the laboratory of Anthony J. Hynes at the University of Miami's Rosenstiel School of Marine, Atmospheric, and Earth Science while still in high school. She is a first-generation college graduate, having obtained her B.S. in chemistry from the California Institute of Technology in 2006. During her undergraduate degree, Cossairt worked with Jonas C. Peters on electrocatalytic hydrogen evolution with a cobaloxime complex. Cossairt then pursued a graduate degree in inorganic chemistry at the Massachusetts Institute of Technology, where, under the mentorship of Christopher C. Cummins, she received her PhD in 2010. Her doctoral work focused on the niobium-mediated synthesis of phosphorus-rich molecules, such as AsP_{3}. Her academic career next took her to New York, where she joined Columbia University as a National Institutes of Health NRSA Postdoctoral Fellow with Jonathan S. Owen between 2010 and 2012.

== Research ==
Cossairt moved to Seattle in 2012 to begin her independent research career as an assistant professor in the department of chemistry at the University of Washington. Cossairt leads a synthetic inorganic chemistry research group working primarily in colloidal nanoscience. Cossairt's team works to prepare new molecular precursors, develop new synthetic methodologies, and explore the details of complex reaction mechanisms. In particular, her team has pioneered new synthetic strategies to access indium phosphide quantum dots. InP quantum dots have emerged as a class of phosphors for wide color gamut displays and energy-efficient solid-state lighting applications.

== Recognition ==
- 2018 National Fresenius Award (American Chemical Society, sponsored by Phi Lambda Upsilon)
- 2017 Camille Dreyfus Teacher Scholar Award (Camille and Henry Dreyfus Foundation)
- 2016 NSF CAREER Award
- 2015 Packard Fellowship for Science and Engineering (David and Lucile Packard Foundation)
- 2015 Sloan Research Fellowship (Alfred P. Sloan Foundation)
- 2015 Seattle AWIS Award for Early Career Achievement

== Organizations ==
- Associate editor at the ACS journal Inorganic Chemistry.
- Co-founder (along with Jillian Dempsey, UNC Chapel Hill) of the Chemistry Women Mentorship Network, a national network of women in chemistry to provide support, encouragement, and mentorship for young women considering continuing their education or pursuing careers in academia.
