= European Latsis Prize =

- Description: Award for outstanding and innovative contributions in European research
- Sponsored by: Latsis Foundation
- Presented by: European Science Foundation (ESF)
- Reward: 100,000 CHF
- Website: fondationlatsis.org/en/latsis-european-prize/

The European Latsis Prize is awarded annually by the European Science Foundation for "outstanding and innovative contributions in a selected field of European research". The prize is worth 100,000 Swiss francs and is awarded within a different discipline each year. The prize was inaugurated in 1999 by the Latsis Foundation and ended in 2012. The prize was awarded in a different scientific field.

== Laureates ==
Year	Awardee	Country	Chosen Field	Rationale
1999	Jürgen Baumert	Germany	"Research and/or Innovation in Education"	
2000	Kenneth Holmes	Germany; United Kingdom	"Molecular Structure"	
2001	André Berger	Belgium	"Climate Research"	
2002	Annette Karmiloff-Smith	United Kingdom	"Cognitive Sciences"	
2003	Colin Renfrew	United Kingdom	"Archaeology"	
2004	Amos Bairoch	Switzerland	"Bioinformatics"	
2005	Donal Bradley	United Kingdom	"Nano-Engineering"	
2006	Rainer Bauböck	Austria	"immigration and social cohesion in modern societies"	"for his in-depth research on migration issues"
2007	Willi Kalender	Germany	"Medical Imaging"	"for his outstanding contributions in the field of medical imaging"
2008	Simon White	United Kingdom	"Astrophysics"	"for his outstanding contribution to the field of astrophysics"
2009	Uta Frith	United Kingdom/Germany		
2009	Chris Frith	United Kingdom/Germany		
2010	Ilkka Hanski	Finland	"Biodiversity"	"for his contributions to research concerning biodiversity in general and metapopulation biology in particular"
2011	James Vaupel	Germany	"Demography"	"for his contributions to research on ageing and lifespan, and his profound influence on demographic research"
2012	Uffe Haagerup	Denmark	“Mathematics”	"for ground-breaking and important contributions to the theory of operator algebras"

== See also ==
- Swiss Science Prize Latsis
