= Jacques Fellay =

Swiss medical doctor and researcher

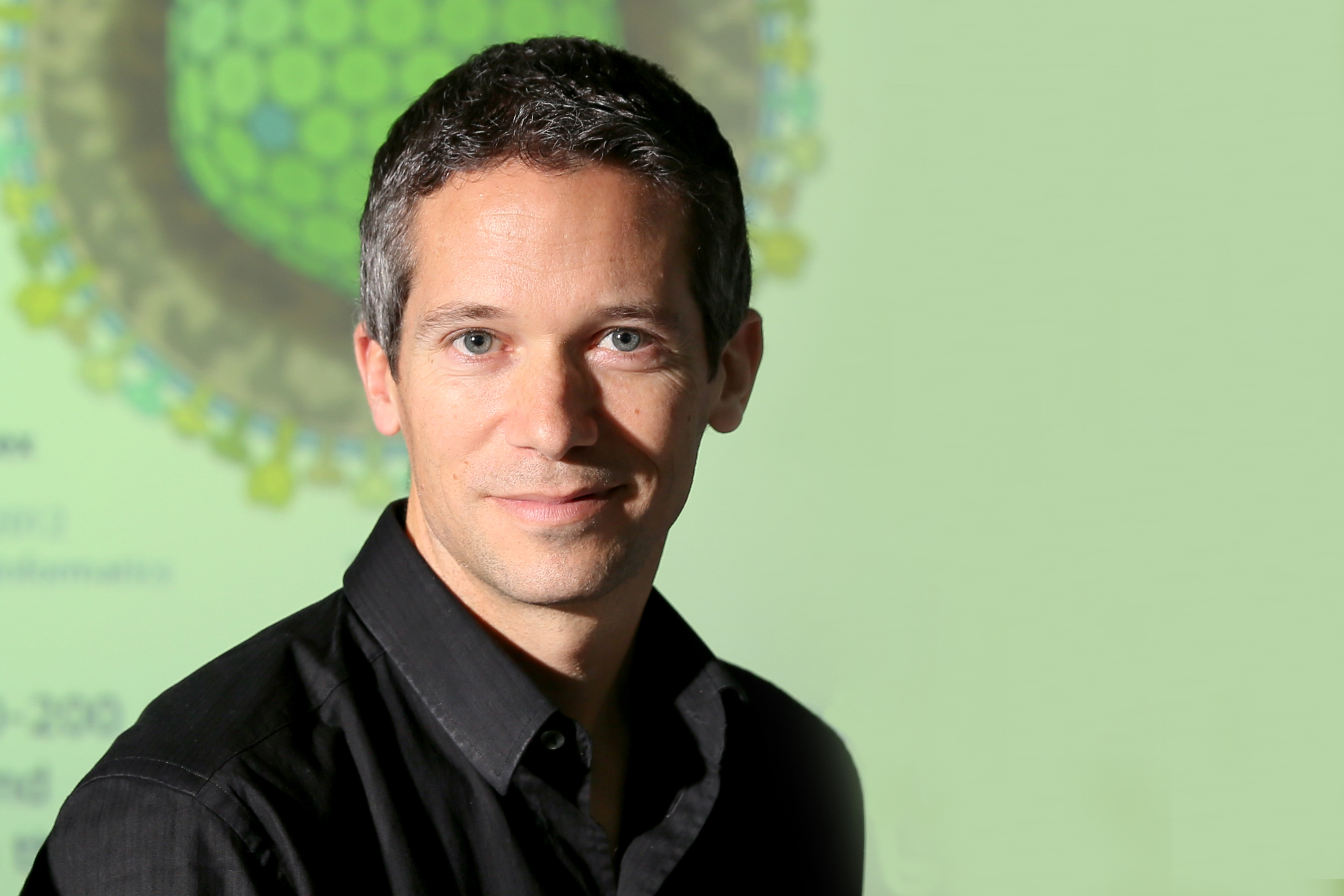
- Fellay in 2020
- Born: Orsières, Switzerland
- Awards: National Latsis Prize (2012); Leenaards Prize (2015)
- Website: https://fellay-lab.epfl.ch

Jacques Fellay (born 12 August 1974) is a Swiss medical doctor and researcher active in the fields of human genomics and infectious diseases. He is an associate professor at the École Polytechnique Fédérale de Lausanne, where he leads the laboratory of Human Genomics of Infection and Immunity.

== Career ==
Fellay studied medicine in Fribourg, Lausanne and Vienna, and obtained his medical degree from the University of Lausanne in 2000. He then received an MD from the University of Lausanne and a PhD from Utrecht University. He was clinically trained in infectious diseases in Switzerland, before spending 4 years as a research scientist at Duke University. He joined the School of Life Sciences, EPFL in 2011.

Fellay is associate Professor in the School of Life Sciences, EPFL and at the University of Lausanne, founding director of the Precision Medicine Unit of the Lausanne University Hospital, group leader at the Swiss Institute of Bioinformatics, as well as co-director of the Health2030 Genome Center in Geneva.

He is a member of the Swiss Federal Commission for Genetic Studies in Humans and of the Swiss National COVID-19 Science Task Force.

== Research ==
Fellay leads the laboratory of Human Genomics of Infection and Immunity at EPFL, which uses large-scale genomic approaches and bioinformatic tools to explore the impact of human genetic variation on infectious diseases, immune parameters and host-pathogen interactions. At the crossroad between basic biomedical science and the clinical world, his research aims at identifying the genomic factors modulating the human response to infectious and immune diseases, with the ultimate goal of offering novel diagnostic, preventative or therapeutic solutions customized to the unique genetic background of every patient. His publications have led to the identification of genetic factors influencing host control and therapy response to viral infections such as HIV, Hepatitis C or respiratory diseases.

== Distinctions ==
Fellay was awarded with the 2012 National Latsis Prize and the 2015 Leenaards Prize for translational medical research for his contributions to the better understanding of genetic susceptibility to HIV and Hepatitis C infections.

He also received the Basic Research in Infectious Diseases Award in 2008 and 2017 from the Swiss Society for Infectious Diseases.
