= Aaron Sadow =

American inorganic chemist

Aaron David Sadow is an American chemist.

Sadow earned a bachelor's of science degree in chemistry from Pennsylvania State University in 1997, and authored the honors thesis New Process for Synthesis of Polymers via Oxidative Carbonylation using Palladium (II) Catalysts under the direction of Ayusman Sen. Sadow completed his doctoral dissertation, Early Transition Metal Complexes in σ-Bond Metathesis: The Activation of Si–H, Si–C, and C–H Bonds, in 2003, advised by T. Don Tilley of the University of California, Berkeley, then pursued postdoctoral research at ETH Zurich. Sadow joined the Iowa State University faculty in August 2005. In 2016, he was promoted to a full professorship. Sadow is a founding researcher for the Program on Plastics, Ecosystems, and Public Health, established in 2019 and based at the Institute for Sustainability and Energy at Northwestern University. Sadow was named the director of Ames National Laboratory's Institute for Cooperative Upcycling of Plastics in 2020, one of the Energy Frontier Research Centers established that year by the United States Department of Energy. Sadow is a 2022 fellow of the American Association for the Advancement of Science.

Sadow's research includes inorganic and organometallic chemistry, particularly catalysis.
