= Andrea Ablasser =

German immunologist

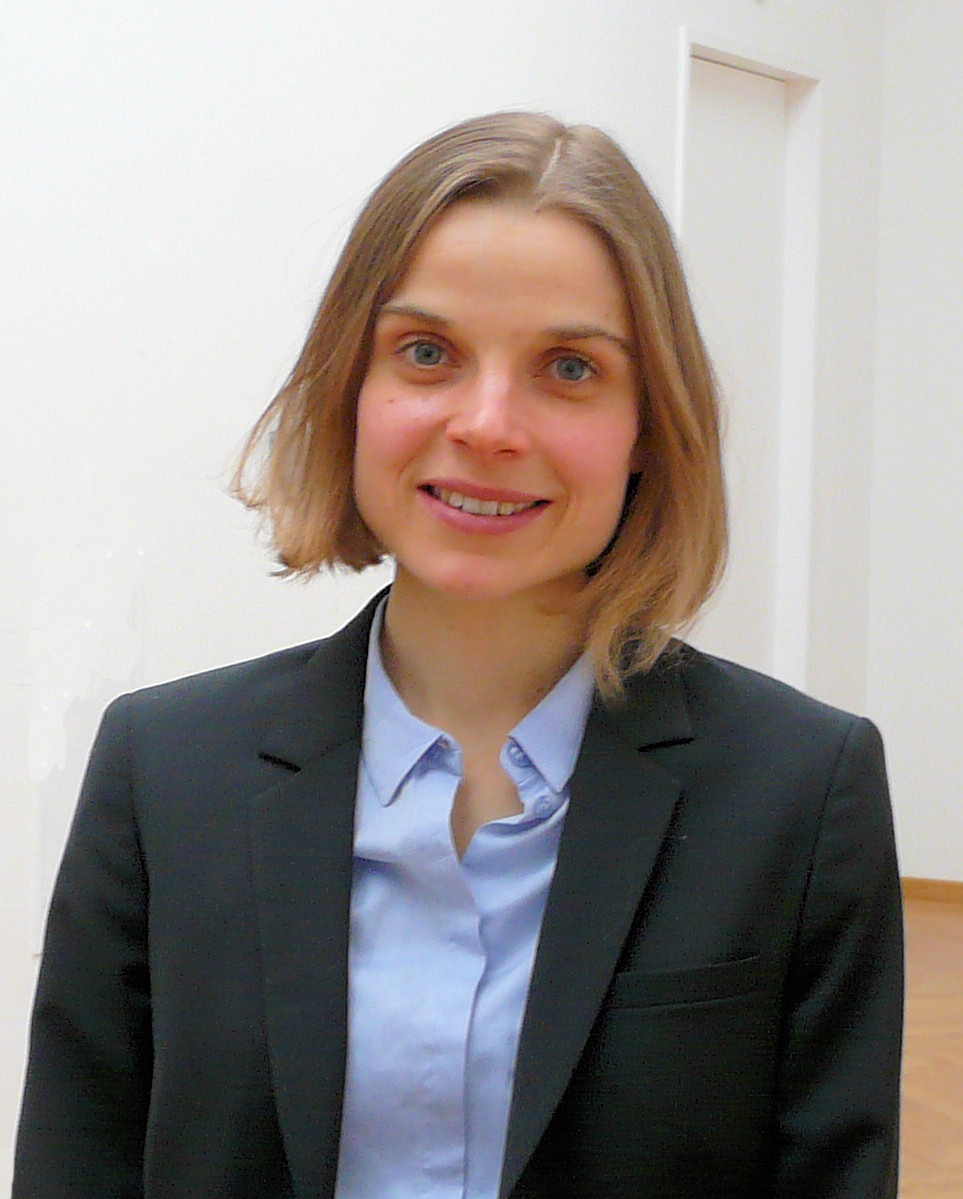
- Andrea Ablasser in 2014
- Born: 1983 (age 42–43); Bad Friedrichshall, Heilbronn, Baden-Württemberg, Germany
- Awards: Jürgen Wehland Prize; Paul Ehrlich Prize for Young Researchers

Academic background
- Education: LMU Munich; University of Massachusetts; Harvard Medical School

Academic work
- Institutions: University of Bonn; École Polytechnique Fédérale de Lausanne
- Main interests: DNA sensors

Andrea Ablasser (born 1983) is a German immunologist, who works as a full professor of Life Sciences at the École Polytechnique Fédérale de Lausanne. Her research has focused on how the innate immune system is able to recognise virus-infected cells and pathogens.

== Early life and education ==
Ablasser was born in 1983 to a physician father and mathematician mother. She was born in Bad Friedrichshall and moved to Buchloe at the age of three, where her father was the chief physician at the Buchloer Hospital. She attended Gymnasiums in Türkheim and Hohenschwangau, and was inspired by her father to study medicine at LMU Munich. She completed part of her studies at the University of Massachusetts and did part of her practical training at Harvard Medical School. When she finished her medical degree in 2008, she was ranked as one of the top ten students in Germany. Although she initially wanted to pursue oncology, she chose to write a doctoral thesis in the field of immunology, and received her doctorate from LMU in 2010.

== Career ==
After completing her doctorate, Ablasser followed her thesis supervisor from LMU to the University of Bonn. She worked at the Institute of Clinical Chemistry and Clinical Pharmacology as the head of a junior research group. Her research focused on DNA sensors that allow the innate immune system to detect whether a cell is infected. She discovered a novel second messenger molecule that is produced by a particular DNA sensor and "alerts" nearby cells when it encounters a pathogen. In 2013, she was awarded the Jürgen Wehland Prize by the Helmholtz Centre for Infection Research for her research on the mechanisms by which the innate immune system recognises pathogens, and specifically her identification of receptors and regulatory molecules that are activated in virally infected cells. In 2014, she won the Paul Ehrlich and Ludwig Darmstaedter Prize for Young Researchers and the German GlaxoSmithKline Foundation's "Medical Research" Science Award. In 2018 she was awarded the Eppendorf Award for Young European Investigators for her findings in innate immunity. In 2018 she also awarded the European Research Council (ERC) Starting Grant for her project “ImAgine: Exploring the link between innate Immunity and cellular Aging.” Ablasser in her own words says, "With ImAgine we aim to refine our understanding of the molecular connections between innate immunity and cellular senescence with the goal to exploit this knowledge for novel therapeutic strategies.” In 2019, she was elected as an EMBO member.

Ablasser was appointed as a tenured track assistant professor at the École Polytechnique Fédérale de Lausanne (EPFL) in the university's Global Health Institute in 2014. She has since been promoted to associate professor, and in May 2021 to full professor.

== Awards ==
- 2014: Paul Ehrlich and Ludwig Darmstaedter Nachwuchspreis
- 2018: Eppendorf Award for Young European Investigators
- 2018: Swiss Science Prize Latsis for her work on understanding the immune system.
- 2021: Pezcoller Foundation-EACR Translational Cancer Researcher Award
- 2021: Dr. Josef Steiner Cancer Research Award
- 2021: EMBO Gold Medal
- 2025: Paul Ehrlich and Ludwig Darmstaedter Prize
