= Laurel Schafer =

Canadian scientist

- Born: Wellesley, Ontario, Canada
- Education: BS.c, University of Guelph; PhD., University of Victoria
- Alma mater: University of Guelph University of Victoria
- Known for: Canada Research Chair in Catalyst Development Fellow of the American Association for the Advancement of Science Fellow of the Royal Society of Canada
- Scientific career
- Institutions: University of British Columbia
- Doctoral advisor: David J. Berg
- Other academic advisors: Don Tilley

Laurel Schafer FRSC is a Canadian Organic chemist. She is a full professor at the University of British Columbia and Canada Research Chair in Catalyst Development. Schafer's research is at the intersection of organometallic and organic chemistry.

== Early life and education ==
Schafer grew up on a farm in Wellesley, Ontario, Canada. She completed her BSc at the University of Guelph in 1993, and her PhD at the University of Victoria in 1999 where she worked with Prof. David J. Berg. She worked as an NSERC Postdoctoral Fellow at the University of California, Berkeley with Prof. T. Don Tilley.

== Career ==
Schafer joined the Department of Chemistry at the University of British Columbia (UBC) in 2001. She was shortly thereafter the recipient of the 2004 Boehringer Ingelheim Young Investigator Award for Organic Synthesis and UBC's Teaching Excellence Award. In 2007, Schafer was promoted to Associate Professor and named a Sloan Fellow.

In 2011, Schafer was appointed a Tier 2 Canada Research Chair (CRC) in Catalyst Development. She also received funding from the Discovery Accelerator Supplements program to investigate catalysts that produces no by-products and minimizes energy consumption in the synthesis of useful chemical structures. While serving in her role as CRC, she was also elected a Fellow of the American Association for the Advancement of Science in 2014. Schafer also received funding for an Industrial Collaborative Research and Training Experience (CREATE) Program in the area of Sustainable Synthesis. The program was aimed to teach graduate students the importance of the green economy and clean technologies. For this, she was the recipient of UBC's 2013 Killam Award for Excellence in Mentoring.

In 2015, Schafer received the Clara Benson Award as a woman who made distinguished contribution to chemistry while working in Canada. In December of the following year, Schafer was renewed as a Tier 2 Canada Research Chair in Catalyst Development.

As a result of her research, Schafer was elected a Fellow of the Royal Society of Canada in 2017. Two years later, she was appointed a Tier 1 Canada Research Chair in Catalyst Development. She also became the first woman to have risen through the ranks to full Professor in the Department of Chemistry at the University of British Columbia.

=== Research ===
Schafer's research is at the intersection of organometallic and organic chemistry. At UBC, she established a Canada Foundation for Innovation funded interdisciplinary research facility that aims at promoting research excellence from hetero- and homogeneous catalysis through to biocatalysis.
