= Astrid Epiney =

Swiss professor of law (born 1965)

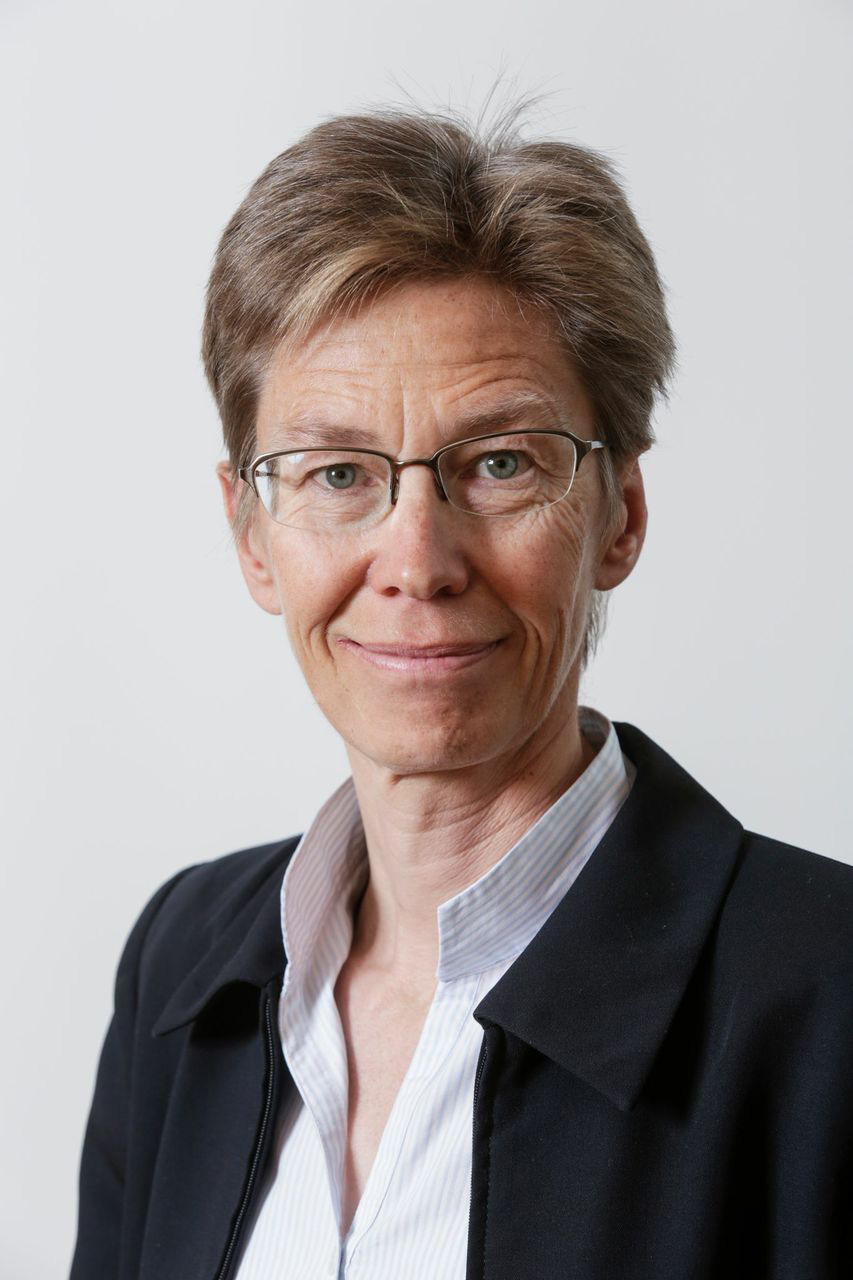
- Born: 9 July 1965 (age 60)
- Awards: Knight of the Legion of Honour
- Scientific career
- Fields: International, European and Swiss public law
- Institutions: Rector, University of Fribourg

Astrid Epiney, born Wander (born 9 July 1965) is a German-Swiss jurist. She is professor of international law, European law and Swiss public law at the University of Fribourg, and became its first female rector in 2015.

== Career ==
Astrid Epiney attended school in her native city of Mainz and studied law at Johannes Gutenberg University of Mainz. She obtained her doctorate there in 1991, and from 1989 to 1991 she also studied Swiss law at the University of Lausanne. After a post-doctorate with the European University Institute in Florence (1991-1992), she worked as a researcher at the IDHEAP in Lausanne from 1992 to 1994.

In September 1994 she was appointed associate professor at the University of Fribourg, and in 1996 she was appointed regular professor and director of the Institute of European Law. She was dean of the Faculty of Law (2005–2007), member of the Swiss National Science Foundation (2002–-2010), vice rector of the university (2007–2011) and president of the Swiss Council for Science and Innovation (2012–2015). In 2014, the university elected her rector for the period of 2015 to 2019.

Her publications include some 20 monographs in the area of international, European and Swiss law. She is particularly noted for her writings on the relationship between Switzerland and the EU.

Epiney is also a pipe organ player. She trained playing the instrument in Mainz from 1980 to 1983, where she also directed a choir between 1983 and 1988.

== Awards ==
- 1995: Swiss National Science Foundation national Latsis prize.
- 2011: Knight of the Legion of Honour. She received the award for her work in European law, her international collaborations and her teaching work.
