= Organometallics =

- Discipline: Chemistry
- Language: English
- Edited by: Paul J. Chirik

Publication details
- History: 1982–present
- Publisher: American Chemical Society (United States)
- Frequency: Biweekly
- Impact factor: 3.837 (2021)

Standard abbreviations
- ISO 4: Organometallics

Indexing
- CODEN: ORGND7
- ISSN: 0276-7333 (print); 1520-6041 (web)
- LCCN: 82644003
- OCLC no.: 07411854

Links
- Journal homepage

Organometallics is a biweekly journal published by the American Chemical Society. Its area of focus is organometallic and organometalloid chemistry. This peer-reviewed journal has an impact factor of 3.837 as reported by the 2021 Journal Citation Reports by Thomson Reuters.

Since 2015 Paul Chirik is the editor-in-chief of Organometallics. He is an American chemist and the Edwards S. Sanford Professor of Chemistry at Princeton University, and associate director for external partnerships of the Andlinger Center for Energy and the Environment. He writes about the catalysis of hydrocarbons.

Past editors-in-chief are Dietmar Seyferth and John Gladysz. This journal is indexed in Chemical Abstracts Service (CAS), British Library, CAB International, EBSCOhost, ProQuest, PubMed, SCOPUS, SwetsWise, and Web of Science.

== See also ==
- Organic Letters
- Inorganic Chemistry
- The Journal of Organic Chemistry
