= Galactose oxidase =

Galactose Oxidase
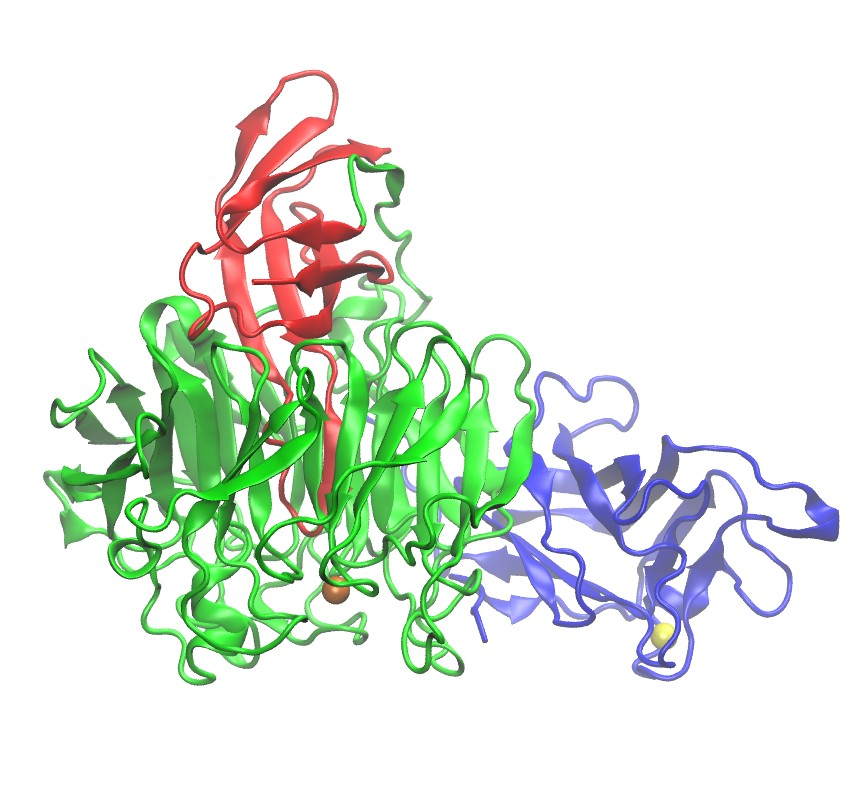
- Crystal structure of galactose oxidase showing three domains: Domain 1 (blue), Domain 2 (green), and Domain 3 (red)

Identifiers
- EC no.: 1.1.3.9
- CAS no.: 9028-79-9

Databases
- BRENDA: enzyme data
- ExPASy: NiceZyme view
- KEGG: enzyme entry
- MetaCyc: metabolic pathway
- Rhea: reactions
- PDB structures: RCSB PDB PDBe PDBsum
- Gene Ontology: AmiGO / QuickGO
Search
- PMC: articles
- PubMed: articles
- NCBI: proteins

Galactose oxidase (D-galactose:oxygen 6-oxidoreductase, D-galactose oxidase, beta-galactose oxidase; abbreviated GAO, GAOX, GOase; EC 1.1.3.9) is an enzyme that catalyzes the oxidation of D-galactose in some species of fungi.

Galactose oxidase belongs to the family of oxidoreductases. Copper ion is required as a cofactor for galactose oxidase. A remarkable feature of galactose oxidase is that it is a free radical enzyme. Its catalytic site contains a free radical ligand coordinating to the copper center. This free radical ligand is a covalently cross-linked cysteine and tyrosine side chains that is formed during post-translational modification.

== Background ==
Found in several fungal species such as Fusarium graminearum NRRL 2903 (formerly misidentified as Dactylium dendroides), and other species of Fusarium and Aspergillus genera, galactose oxidase was first isolated in 1959. This enzyme is secreted by fungi to function in extracellular space. Although the oxidation reaction of D-galactose gives galactose oxidase its name, the coupled reduction of dioxygen to hydrogen peroxide is believed to have greater physiological significance in yeasts. Hydrogen peroxide which can be produced by yeasts in this way is possibly a bacteriostatic agent.

== Protein structure ==
Galactose oxidase contains 639 amino acids. It is a single peptide monomer that has three β-structural domains. Domain 1 (residues 1-155) is a β-sandwich consisting of eight antiparallel β-strands. It contains a possible binding site for Na^{+} or Ca^{2+}, which may serve structural roles in the protein. Another feature of Domain 1 is the presence of a carbohydrate binding site that direct the enzyme to bind to extracellular carbohydrates. Domain 2 (residues 156-552) contains the copper binding site. The β-strands in Domain 2 are organized as a seven-fold propeller, and each of the seven structural units is a subdomain consisting of four antiparallel β-strands. Domain 3 (residues 553-639) consists of seven anti-parallel β-strands and forms a “cap” over Domain 2. One histidine (His581) of Domain 3 serves as the ligand for copper, contributing to the metal-containing active site of the enzyme.

== Active site ==
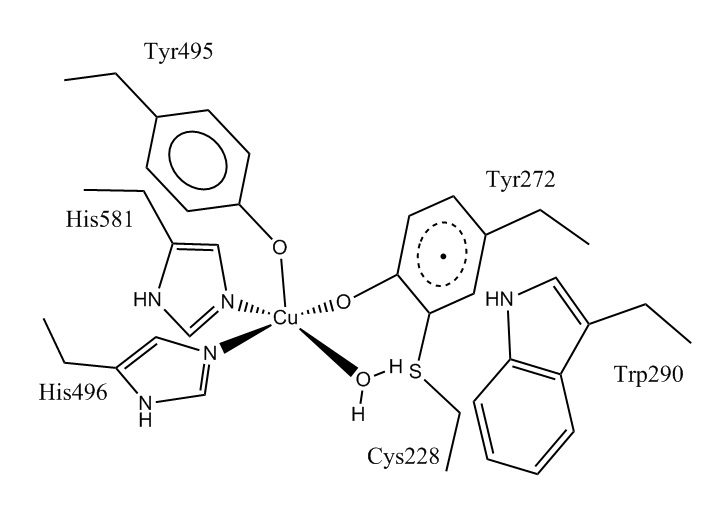
Active site structure of galactose oxidase with coordinating ligands shown. The indole ring of Trp290 forms a "shield" protecting the active site. Note the lengthened copper-solvent bond.

Galactose oxidase is a type II copper protein. It contains a single copper center that adopts square planar or square-based pyramidal coordination geometry. The copper center has five coordinating ligands: two tyrosines (Tyr272 and Tyr495), two histidines (His496 and His581), and a solvent molecule that is usually water. The copper in the active site of galactose oxidase is described as having a "distorted square pyramidal" coordination geometry. Tyr495 is the axial ligand, the other four ligands lie roughly in a plane. Both histidines coordinate with copper through 3-nitrogen. Copper-H_{2}O bond is the longest coordinate bond; it is labile and can be replaced by a substrate molecule. Tyr272 forms a dimer with a cysteine (Cys228) through an ortho carbon of tyrosine and the sulfur atom of cysteine, which is supported by X-ray crystallography studies. The Tyr-Cys cross-link decreases the structural flexibility of Tyr272. This cross-linked tyrosinate is also a free radical. In the fully oxidized form of galactose oxidase, the free radical couples to the copper(II) center antiferromagnetically, supported by EPR spectroscopic studies. Moreover, the formation of cross-linking thioether bond is believed to lower the oxidation potential of Tyr272 phenoxide, making this phenoxyl more easily oxidized to form the radical in post-translational modification.

The free radical in galactose oxidase is unusually stable compared to many other protein free radicals. The free radical ligand is stabilized mainly in two ways. Firstly, as revealed by computational chemistry studies, the unpaired electron is stabilized through delocalization by the aromatic ring of tyrosine and the cross-linked cysteine sulfur, with the oxygen atom of Tyr272 possessing high unpaired electron density. Some experimental evidence also suggests that axial Tyr495 is also involved in unpaired electron delocalization. Secondly, the indole ring of a tryptophan (Trp290) lies above and parallel to Tyrosine-Cysteine, behaving like a shield protecting the radical from the external solvent environment. Supporting evidence comes from that mutation of this tryptophan residue leads to a lower stability of the active form of galactose oxidase. Additionally, the outer sphere of the active site consists of many aromatic residues that give the active site a hydrophobic character. There are also extensive hydrogen bonding networks surround the active site.

== Reaction ==
In yeasts, galactose oxidase catalyzes the following reaction:

D-galactopyranose
O_{2}
H_{2}O_{2}
O_{2}
H_{2}O_{2}
galacto-hexodialdose

This reaction is essentially the oxidation of primary alcohol using oxygen to form the corresponding aldehyde and hydrogen peroxide. It has been shown that galactose oxidase is also able to catalyze various primary alcohols other than galactose. In fact, galactose oxidase catalyzes dihydroxyacetone three times faster than it does to galactose. The reaction is regioselective, in that it cannot oxidize secondary alcohol.

This two-electron oxidation is achieved by the double-redox site: the copper(II) metal center and the free radical, each capable of accepting one electron from the substrate. This double-redox center has three accessible oxidation levels. In the catalytic cycle of galactose oxidase, the enzyme shuttles between the fully oxidized form and the fully reduced form. The semi-oxidized form is the inactive form.

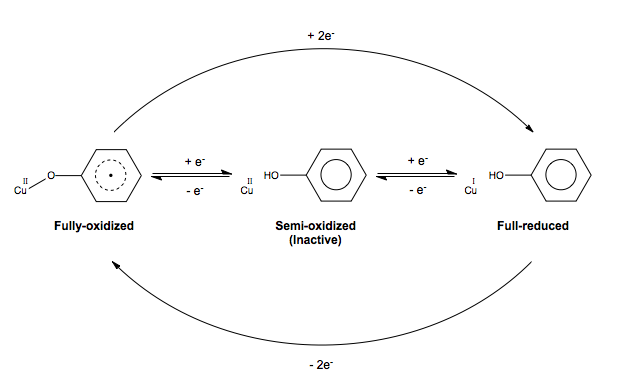
Redox scheme of GAOX and three oxidation states

== Catalytic mechanism ==
The accepted catalytic mechanism, called the “ping-pong mechanism,” consists of four major stages. The first stage is the oxidation of the substrate by the double-redox center. After the hydroxyl group of substrate alcohol occupies the solvent coordination site, the hydroxyl group is deprotonated by Tyr495, followed by the release of Tyr495. This step makes the alcohol more prone to oxidation. The proton on the carbon to which the hydroxyl group used to be attached is then transferred to Tyr272 (serving as the hydrogen acceptor), coupled with the oxidation of the substrate. One electron goes to the radical ligand, the other electron goes to the copper(II) center, which is then reduced to copper(I) as a result. Meanwhile, Tyr272 radical is also reduced. The proton subtraction step is rate determining and stereospecific since only the pro-S hydrogen on the alcohol carbon is removed (supported by studies of its kinetic isotope effect). The overall result of stage 1 is the removal of two hydrogen atoms and the removal two electrons from the substrate, of which the order is unclear, however. The second stage is the release of oxidized substrate (aldehyde in this case) and the coordination of dioxygen at the substrate coordination site. In the third stage, dioxygen is rapidly reduced by copper(I) to form superoxide. The superoxide is a reactive species that subtracts the proton and an electron from the Tyr272 and re-forms the tyrosine radical. In the fourth stage, the hydroperoxide deprotonates Tyr496 and is released as H_{2}O_{2}. Subsequent axial coordination of Tyr496 and equatorial coordination of new substrate molecule to the copper center completes the turnover of the enzyme.

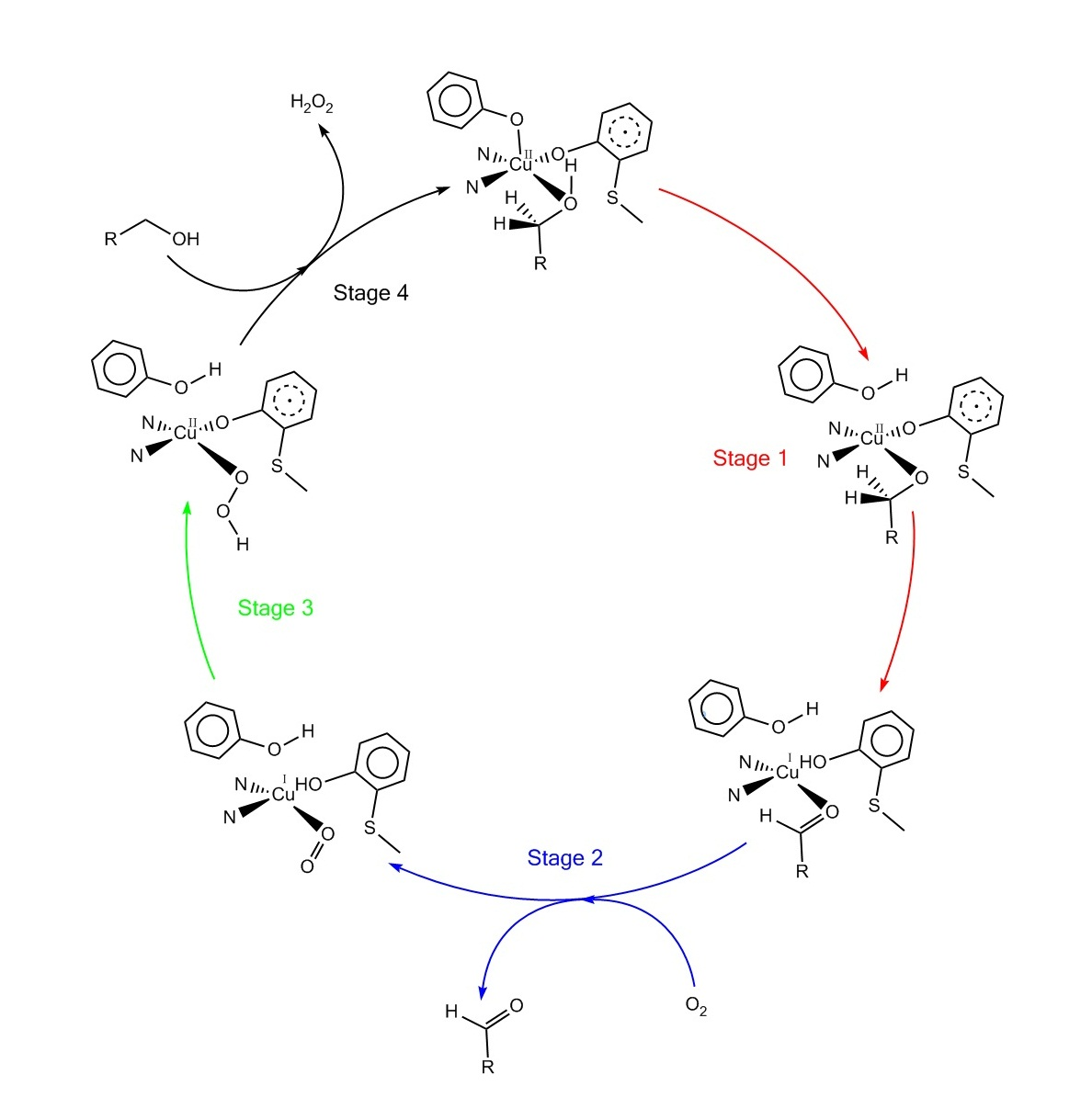
Catalytic Mechanism of Galactose Oxidase

== Post-translational modification ==
Prepro-GAOX (galactose oxidase with signal sequence) is processed twice by proteolytic cleavage in the leader sequence to form the mature GAOX peptide (pro-GAOX). The first cleavage removes a sequence of 24 amino acids by signal peptidase. The second cleavage removes another sequence of 17 amino acids.

The covalent linkage between Tyr272 and Cys228 forms after pro-GAOX has been made. The occurrence of this modification does not seem to require any other “helper” proteins. The current mechanism for the formation of this covalent linkage suggests the requirement of copper(I) and dioxygen. The mechanism for this tyrosine-cysteine linkage is not thoroughly understood, but a few key events have been predicted: copper(I) coordinates with Tyr272 and histidines at the (future) active site. Reaction of dioxygen with the active site complex generates a free radical intermediate. Two possible forms of the free radical, thiyl and phenoxyl, are possible; addition of thiyl radical to phenol, or addition of phenoxyl radical to thiol, generates the covalent linkage between the sulfur atom of cysteine and the aromatic ring of tyrosine; A second dioxygen molecule reacts with the copper center coordinated with cross-linked tyrosine-cysteine to generate radical-copper complex.

== Applications ==
=== Bioanalysis ===
Biomolecules in samples such as galactose can be quantified using oxygen detection method, since one equivalent consumption of oxygen corresponds to one equivalent primary hydroxyl group oxidized. The formation of hydrogen peroxide during substrate oxidation can also be used for colorimetric detection of galactose using dyes that are oxidized by hydrogen peroxide. Because carbohydrates can normally have primary hydroxyl groups, galactose oxidase can be used to modify cell surface glycoproteins to achieve cell labelling.

=== Organic synthesis ===
Galactose oxidase has been utilized as a biocatalyst in the synthesis of aldehydes and carboxylic acids from primary alcohols.

=== Biomimetic compounds ===
Our understanding of the mechanism of galactose oxidase inspires researchers to develop model compounds that mimics the structure and function of galactose oxidase. It appears that electron-sharing between the copper and the free radical is the crucial element in the success of synthesizing these compounds. The first model compound of GAOX made is [Cu(II)(dnc)], which utilizes duncamine (dnc) as the chelating ligand. Other model compounds have been studied and reported in literature.
