= Gregory L. Hillhouse =

American inorganic chemist

Gregory Lee Hillhouse
- Born: March 1, 1955; Greenville, South Carolina
- Died: March 6, 2014 (aged 59); Chicago, Illinois
- Education: University of South Carolina B.S. 1976; Indiana University Bloomington Ph.D. 1980
- Scientific career
- Workplaces: California Institute of Technology, University of Chicago
- Thesis: Reactions of tungsten complexes with molecules containing nitrogen-nitrogen bonds (1980)
- Doctoral advisor: Barry L. Haymore
- Other academic advisors: Edward E. Mercer, Derek J. Hodgson, John E. Bercaw
- Notable students: Jonas C. Peters

Gregory Lee Hillhouse (March 1, 1955 – March 6, 2014) was an inorganic chemist with a long-standing interest in the chemistry of organotransition metal compounds at the University of Chicago. Much of his work focused on creating organometallic compounds to stabilize and isolate reactive intermediates, molecules that are proposed to exist briefly during a larger catalytic reaction progress.

== Biography ==
Hillhouse was born on March 1, 1955, in Greenville, South Carolina. He attended the University of South Carolina in 1976 and received his Ph.D. from Indiana University Bloomington in 1980. He then became a postdoctoral research associate at California Institute of Technology, before taking a position in the department of chemistry at the University of Chicago in 1983.

Professor Hillhouse was not only a dedicated researcher but also a dedicated mentor and teacher to dozens of undergraduates at the University of Chicago. He won the prestigious Quantrell Award for Excellence in Undergraduate Teaching at the University of Chicago in 1997.

He died from cancer at his home in Chicago on March 6, 2014, aged 59.

== Research ==
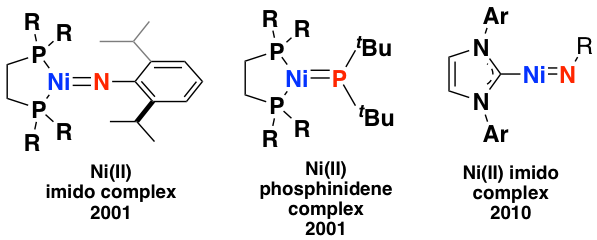
Representative Ni(II) complexes isolated in the Hillhouse laboratory.

=== Organometallic nickel complexes ===
While the early work of Hillhouse focused on early-transition metal chemistry, his later career efforts were dedicated towards base metals. For example, in 2001 Hillhouse and co-workers synthesized a complex that refuted the notion that it was impossible for late transition metals like nickel to form multiple bonds with heteroatoms. The result was a molecule that he affectionately referred to as “Double Nickel,” which possessed an indisputable nickel-nitrogen double bond. Later the group published a study showcasing that one can also synthesize and isolated an electronically similar phosphinidine species. Additionally, using bulky N-heterocyclic carbene (NHC) ligands, Hillhouse and co-workers showed that one can stabilize a linear two-coordinate Ni-based imido species. His group has also showcased how some of these and similar complexes can undergo redox chemistry forming Ni(I) and Ni(III) species.

== Personal life ==
Hillhouse was gay, although he did not come out openly in his professional career until later in his life. In his career as a teacher and mentor, he served as a role model for younger LGBTQ+ chemists.
