= Louise Berben =

Australian chemist

Louise Antoinette Berben
- Born: Sydney
- Education: University of New South Wales (B.Sc.) (2000); University of California, Berkeley (Ph.D) (2005)
- Scientific career
- Fields: Inorganic Chemistry, Electrochemistry
- Workplaces: Massachusetts Institute of Technology; California Institute of Technology; University of California, Davis
- Thesis: Toward acetylide- and N-heterocycle-bridged materials with strong electronic and magnetic coupling (2005)
- Doctoral advisor: Jeffrey R. Long
- Other academic advisors: Jonas C. Peters
- Website: http://chemgroups.ucdavis.edu/~berben/

Louise Antoinette Berben is an Australian American chemist who is Professor of Inorganic Chemistry at the University of California, Davis. She was awarded the 2024 American Chemical Society Award in Organometallic Chemistry.

== Early life and education ==
Berben was born in Sydney. She was an undergraduate student at the University of New South Wales. She moved to the University of California, Berkeley for doctoral research, where she worked alongside Jeffrey R. Long. She was a postdoctoral researcher with Jonas C. Peters at the California Institute of Technology, and together they moved to the Massachusetts Institute of Technology.

== Research and career ==
Berben joined the University of California, Davis in 2009. Her group considers synthetic inorganic chemistry, looking at new transition metal and main group molecules. She is interested in molecules with unusual molecular structures, to enable bond making and breaking reactions. She has developed renewable fuels and chemicals from captured carbon dioxide.

== Awards and honors ==
- 2013 Alfred P. Sloan Foundation Fellow
- 2013 ChemComm Emerging Lecturer
- 2014 American Chemical Society Rising Star Award
- 2014 Elected Fellow of the American Chemical Society
- 2015 Kavli Foundation Fellow
- 2017 Associate Editor for Chemical Society Reviews
- 2024 American Chemical Society Award in Organometallic Chemistry

== Selected publications ==
- Berben, Louise Antoinette; Peters, Jonas Christopher (2009). "Hydrogen evolution by cobalt tetraimine catalysts adsorbed on electrode surfaces". ChemComm. 46 (3): 398–400. doi:10.1039/b921559j. PMID 20066304. S2CID 27842342. Wikidata Q43196950.
- Thompson, Emily; Louise A Berben (2015). "Electrocatalytic Hydrogen Production by an Aluminum(III) Complex: Ligand-Based Proton and Electron Transfer". Angewandte Chemie International Edition. 54 (40): 11642–11646. doi:10.1002/anie.201503935. PMID 26249108. Wikidata Q46108868.
- M Diego Rail; Louise A Berben (2011). "Directing the reactivity of [HFe4N(CO)12]- toward H+ or CO2 reduction by understanding the electrocatalytic mechanism". Journal of the American Chemical Society. 133 (46): 18577–18579. doi:10.1021/ja208312t. PMID 22032761. Wikidata Q46097704.
