= Christopher C. Cummins =

American chemist

Kit Cummins
- Born: Christopher Colin Cummins; February 28, 1966 (age 60); Boston, Massachusetts, U.S.
- Education: Cornell University (BS); Massachusetts Institute of Technology (PhD)
- Awards: Sackler Prize (2007); F. Albert Cotton Award (2007); Ludwig Mond Award (2013); Linus Pauling Medal (2017)
- Scientific career
- Fields: Inorganic Chemistry, Main Group Chemistry
- Workplaces: Massachusetts Institute of Technology
- Thesis: Synthetic investigations featuring amidometallic complexes (1993)
- Doctoral advisor: Richard R. Schrock
- Other academic advisors: Peter T. Wolczanski
- Doctoral students: Brandi Cossairt, Jonas C. Peters
- Other notable students: Paul Chirik (Postdoc); Polly Arnold (Postdoc); Karsten Meyer (Postdoc)
- Website: ccclab.mit.edu/christopher-c-cummins

Christopher "Kit" Colin Cummins (born February 28, 1966) is an American chemist, currently the Henry Dreyfus Professor at the Massachusetts Institute of Technology. He has made contributions to the coordination chemistry of transition metal nitrides, phosphides, and carbides.

== Early life and education ==
Cummins was born in Boston, Massachusetts, on February 28, 1966. He attended Middlebury College and Stanford University before transferring to Cornell University where he performed undergraduate research under the direction of Peter T. Wolczanski. At Cornell, Cummins conducted research on the reactivity of low-coordinate zirconium and titanium complexes bearing bulky silanamide ligands (^{t}Bu_{3}SiNH^{−}), with small molecules such as methane, benzene, and carbon monoxide.

After graduating from Cornell with an AB degree in 1989, Cummins went to the Massachusetts Institute of Technology to obtain his PhD in chemistry in 1993 under the direction of Richard R. Schrock. Cummins conducted doctoral research on the synthesis of low-coordinate transition metal complexes bearing trialkylsilated variants of the tris(2-aminoethyl)amine ligand. In collaboration with Robert E. Cohen, he also discovered a new technique for synthesizing nanoclusters of metal sulfide semiconductors within block copolymer microdomains.

== Independent career ==
After receiving his PhD in 1993, Cummins was invited to stay at MIT as an assistant professor and was later promoted to full professor in 1996. Cummins became the Henry Dreyfus Professor in Chemistry in 2015.

== Research ==
In one contribution, Cummins and coworkers described routes to simple phosphorus compounds including a low temperature route to diphosphorus:

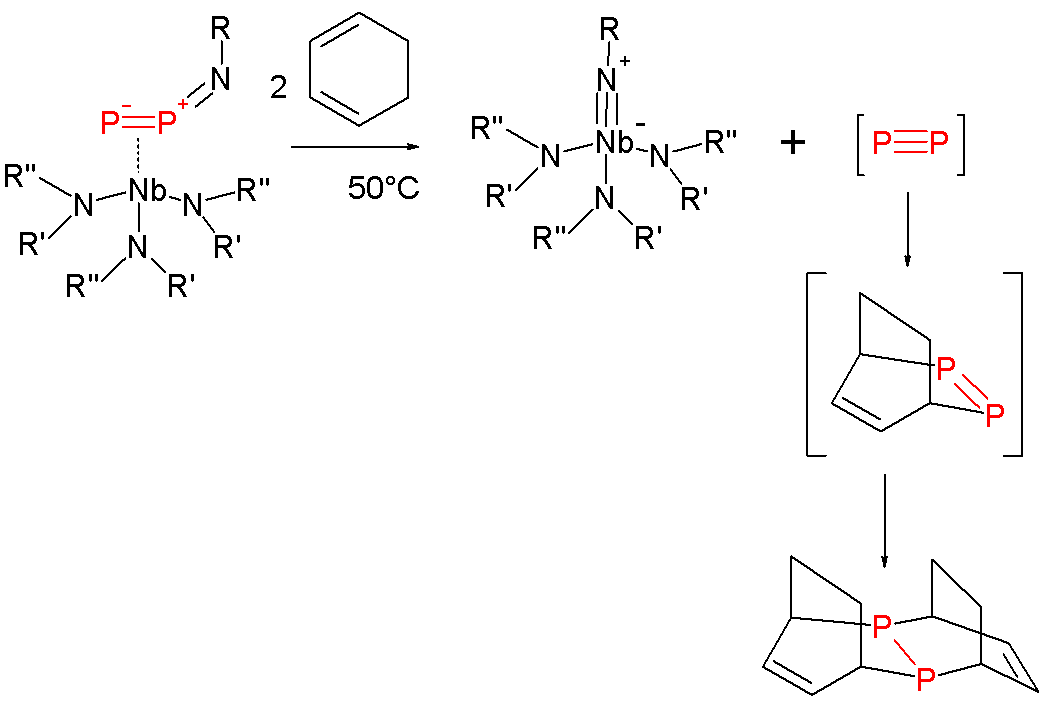

== Honors and awards ==
In 2007, Cummins was awarded the 2007 Raymond and Beverly Sackler Prize in the Physical Sciences by Tel Aviv University and the 2007 F. Albert Cotton Award by the American Chemical Society.

In 2008, Cummins was elected a fellow of the American Academy of Arts & Sciences.

In 2013, Cummins was awarded the Ludwig Mond Award by the Royal Society of Chemistry.

In 2017, Cummins was elected as a member of the National Academy of Sciences. In the same year, the American Chemical Society awarded Cummins the 2017 Linus Pauling Medal in recognition of his synthetic and mechanistic studies of early-transition metal complexes.
