= Wolfgang Lubitz =

German chemist and biophysicist

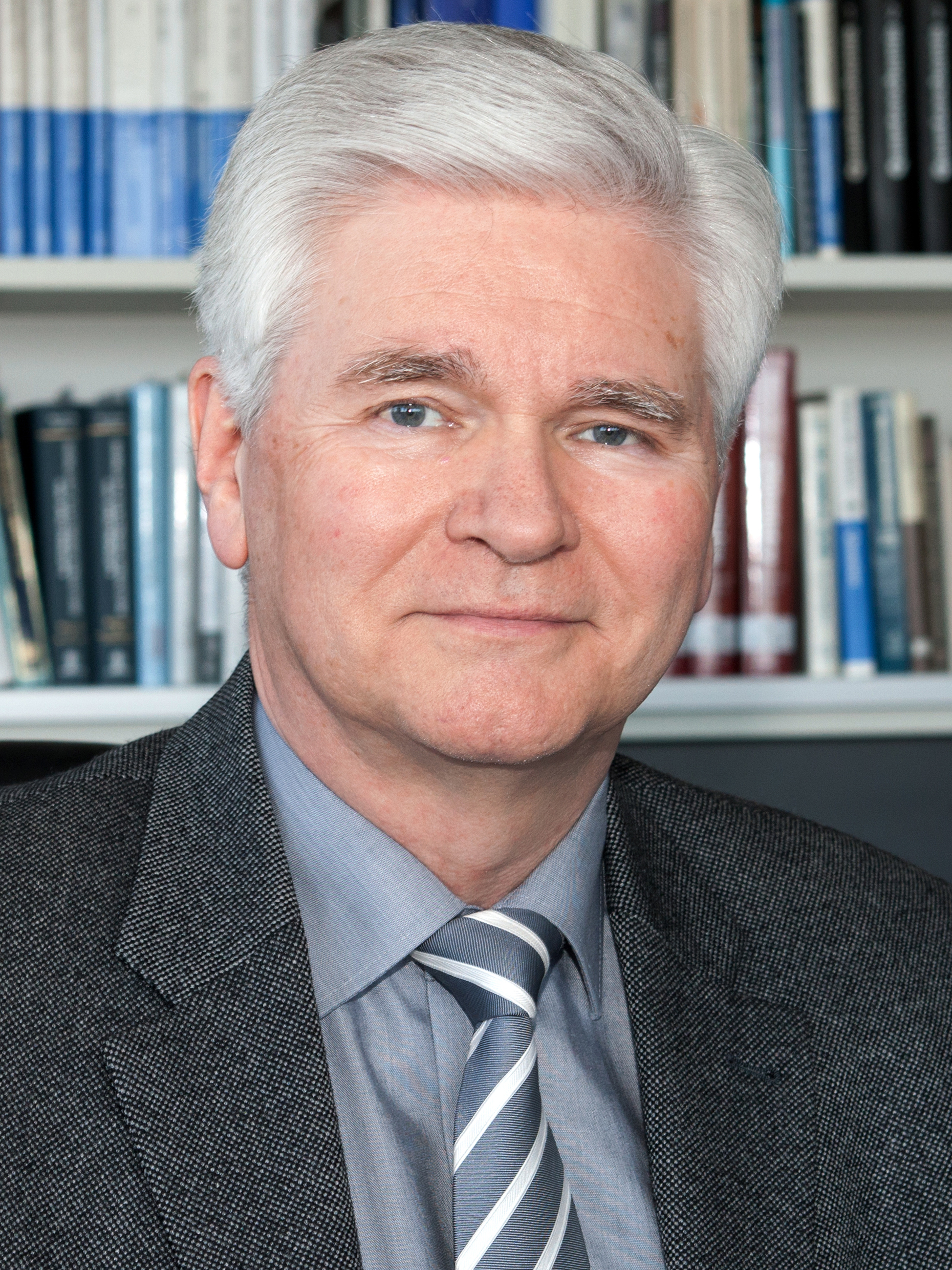
- Born: 1949 (age 76–77); West Berlin, FRG
- Education: Chemistry Free University Berlin (1969–1974); Dr. rer. nat Free University Berlin (1977); Habilitation Free University Berlin (1982)
- Known for: hydrogenases oxygen-evolving complex bacterial and plant photosynthesis Electron paramagnetic resonance
- Scientific career
- Fields: Chemistry; Biochemistry; Biophysics
- Institutions: Free University Berlin (1977–1989); UC San Diego (1983–1984); University of Stuttgart (1989–1991); Technische Universität Berlin (1991–2000); Max Planck Institute for Chemical Energy Conversion (2000–present)

Wolfgang Lubitz (born in 1949) is a German chemist and biophysicist. He is currently a director emeritus at the Max Planck Institute for Chemical Energy Conversion. He is well known for his work on bacterial photosynthetic reaction centres, hydrogenase enzymes, and the oxygen-evolving complex using a variety of biophysical techniques. He has been recognized by a Festschrift for his contributions to electron paramagnetic resonance (EPR) and its applications to chemical and biological systems.

== Education and career ==
He studied chemistry at the Free University Berlin from 1969 to 1974 and continued with his Dr. rer. nat. until 1977. From 1977 to 1982 he worked for his habilitation in organic chemistry at the Free University Berlin with a focus on electron paramagnetic resonance (EPR) and double resonance methods, such as ENDOR/TRIPLE. From 1979 to 1989 the FU Berlin employed him as an assistant professor, and as an associate professor at the Chemistry Department. From 1983 to 1984 he worked as a Max Kade Fellow at UC San Diego in the Physics Department with George Feher on EPR and ENDOR in photosynthesis. In 1989 he became an associate professor of experimental physics at the University of Stuttgart. In 1991 he returned to Berlin as a Full Professor and Chair of Physical Chemistry at the Max Volmer Institute at Technische Universität Berlin. He stayed until 2000 when he became a Scientific Member of the Max Planck Society and Director at the Max Planck Institute for Radiation Chemistry (in 2003 renamed Max Planck Institute for Bioinorganic Chemistry and in 2012 Max Planck Institute for Chemical Energy Conversion) in Mülheim an der Ruhr, North Rhine-Westphalia, Germany. In the same year, he became honorary professor of the Heinrich-Heine-University of Düsseldorf. From 2004 to 2012, he was managing director of the Max Planck Institute and is currently a director emeritus of the Max Planck Institute for Chemical Energy Conversion. Since 2004, he has been a member of the council for the Lindau Nobel Laureate Meetings, and has been its vice-president since 2015.

== Research ==
His research focuses on the elementary processes of photosynthesis and catalytic metal centers in metalloproteins. He is an expert in the application of EPR spectroscopy and quantum chemical calculations. He has over 500 publications with more than 25,000 citations.

=== EPR spectroscopy ===
Throughout his career, EPR has played an important role as a biophysical technique to gain information about radicals, radical pairs, triplet states and metal centers in chemistry and biochemistry. Particular emphasis has been placed on methods that are able to resolve the electron-nuclear hyperfine couplings between the electron spin and the nuclear spins. Next to the more established techniques, electron spin echo modulation (ESEEM) and electron-nuclear double resonance (ENDOR), his group further developed and used electron-electron double resonance- (ELDOR) detected NMR (EDNMR) at a range of mw frequencies. These techniques have been used by him and his group to extensively study bacterial photosynthetic reaction centres, their donor-acceptor model complexes, photosystem I, photosystem II, and a number of different hydrogenases.

=== Oxygen-evolving Complex ===
During his early career, bacterial photosynthetic reaction centres and oxygenic photosystem I and photosystem II have been a main focus. He and his group studied light-induced chlorophyll donor and quinone acceptor radical ions of the primary electron-transfer chain. Later his research focused on the water splitting cycle (S-states) of photosystem II using advanced multifrequency pulse EPR, ENDOR and EDNMR techniques. His group was able to detect and characterize the flash-generated, freeze-trapped paramagnetic states S_{0}, S_{2} and S_{3} (S_{1} is diamagnetic and S_{4} is a transient state) of the Mn_{4}Ca_{1}O_{x} catalytic cluster. By a careful spectral analysis–backed up by quantum chemical calculations the site oxidation and spin states of all Mn ions and their spin coupling for all intermediates of the catalytic cycle could be detected. Further work using advanced Pulse EPR techniques, such as EDNMR, has led to information on the binding of water and a proposal of an efficient O-O bond formation in the final state of the cycle.

=== [NiFe]- and [FeFe]-hydrogenase ===
Extensive work was performed on the [NiFe]-Hydrogenase where the magnetic tensors were measured and related to quantum chemical calculations. Through his work, the structures of all intermediates in the activation path and catalytic cycle of [NiFe]-hydrogenases were obtained. In the course of this work a 0.89 Ångström resolution X-ray crystallography diffraction model of [NiFe]-hydrogenase was achieved.

Similar work has been accomplished for the [FeFe]-hydrogenases. A key contribution of his research was the EPR spectroscopic evidence of an azapropane-dithiolate-ligand (ADT-ligand) in the dithiol bridge of the [FeFe]-hydrogenase active site and the determination of the magnitude and orientation of the g-tensor using single crystal EPR. The ADT-ligand was later confirmed by artificial maturation of [FeFe]-hydrogenases. Using artificial maturation, the protein could be generated without the co-factor (apoprotein) using E. coli mutagenesis and a synthetically created active site could be inserted, which has opened new vistas in hydrogenase research.

== Awards and recognition ==
- Otto-Klung-Preis für Chemie, FU Berlin (1978)
- Max-Kade-Fellowship, New York (1983)
- International Zavoisky Award, Russian and Tatarstan Academy of Sciences, Kazan, Russia (2002)
- Bruker Prize, Royal Society of Chemistry, ESR group, U.K. (2003)
- Fellow of the Royal Society of Chemistry. U.K. (2004)
- Gold Medal of the International EPR Society (2005)
- Honorary doctorate Dr. h. c., Uppsala University, Sweden (2008)
- Fellow of ISMAR (International Society of Magnetic Resonance) (2010)
- Foreign Member of the Academy of Sciences of the Republic of Tatarstan (2012)
- Honorary doctorate, Dr. h.c., Université d'Aix-Marseille, France (2014)
- Robert Bunsen Vorlesung, Deutsche Bunsen-Gesellschaft für Physikalische Chemie e.V. (2017)
- Fellow of the International EPR Society (2017)
