= Paul Chirik =

American chemist and professor

Paul J. Chirik
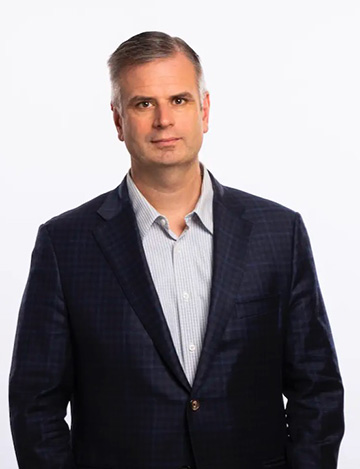
- Born: June 13, 1973 (age 53); Philadelphia, Pennsylvania, United States
- Education: Virginia Tech, B.S. 1995; Caltech, Ph.D. 2000
- Awards: Linus Pauling Medal, Eni Environmental Solutions Prize
- Scientific career
- Fields: Organometallic Chemistry, Catalysis
- Workplaces: Princeton University (2011–present); Cornell University (2001–2011)
- Thesis: Ancillary Ligand Effects on Fundamental Transformations in Metallocene Catalyzed Olefin Polymerization (2000)
- Doctoral advisor: John E. Bercaw
- Other academic advisors: Christopher C. Cummins
- Doctoral students: Suzanne Bart
- Website: chirik.princeton.edu

Paul James Chirik (born June 13, 1973) is an American chemist known for his work in sustainable chemistry using Earth-abundant metals like iron, cobalt, and nickel to surpass the performance of more exotic elements traditionally used in catalysis. He is the Edwards S. Sanford Professor of Chemistry and chair of the chemistry department at Princeton University.

== Academic career ==
Chirik received his B.S. in chemistry from Virginia Tech, studying organometallic chemistry under the advisement of Joseph Merola. He earned his Ph.D. in 2000 at the California Institute of Technology studying polymerization and hydrometallation chemistry with John E. Bercaw. After his postdoctoral work at the Massachusetts Institute of Technology, Chirik joined the chemistry faculty at Cornell University until 2011, when he was named the Edwards S. Sanford Professor of Chemistry at Princeton University.

== Research ==
Chirik’s multidisciplinary research seeks to transform traditional catalysis, which relies on exotic metals like platinum and rhodium to drive chemical reactions. Instead, Chirik uses alternative, Earth-abundant metals like iron and cobalt, developing techniques that allow these metals to mimic or surpass the performance of exotics. An important example of this research was published in 2021 in Nature Chemistry, in which Chirik detailed a route to recyclable plastics through a molecule he discovered called oligocyclobutane. This molecule can be “unzipped” back to its original monomer by employing an iron catalyst in a process known as depolymerization.

Another major focus of Chirik’s lab is improving the process surrounding iron- and cobalt-based catalysis cross-coupling for carbon-carbon bond formation, an essential technology used by the pharmaceutical industry to develop new therapies. Chirik publishes regularly on this technology, with recent papers on cobalt-catalyzed cross-coupling and the addition of halides to a reduced-iron pincer complex to create an improved pathway for a desired end product.

In 2022, Chirik was among the first chemists in the nation to receive a Gordon and Betty Moore Foundation exploration-phase grant in green chemistry based on his proposal for iron catalysts for a biorenewable hydrocarbon future.

He has been the editor-in-chief of the journal Organometallics since 2015.

== Awards and honors ==
- Named Fellow in the American Association for the Advancement of Science, 2023
- Gabor Somorjai Award for Creative Research in Catalysis, 2021
- The Linus Pauling Award, 2020
- Paul N. Rylander Award, 2020
- The Arthur C. Cope Scholar Award, American Chemical Society, 2009
- David and Lucile Packard Fellowship in Science and Engineering, 2004
- Editor-in-Chief, Organometallics, 2015 to present
