= Latsis Foundation =

Swiss-based charity foundation

The Latsis Foundation (French: Fondation Latsis internationale) is a charitable foundation, founded in 1975 by the Greek shipping magnate John Latsis. Amongst other prizes and symposia, it funds the University Latsis Prizes (awarded by the University of Geneva, the University of St. Gallen, the École polytechnique fédérale de Lausanne and the ETH Zurich), the Swiss Science Prize Latsis (awarded by the Swiss National Science Foundation) and the European Latsis Prize (awarded by the European Science Foundation) until 2012.

It has endowed the Lakatos Award. The foundation is based in Geneva.

== See also ==
- Prizes named after people
- Louis-Jeantet Prize for Medicine
- Marcel Benoist Prize
