= Max Planck Institute for Chemical Energy Conversion =

German research institute

Coordinates: 51°25′4″N 6°53′11″E

The Max Planck Institute for Chemical Energy Conversion (MPI CEC) is a research institute of the Max Planck Society. It is located in the German town of Mülheim.

== Research ==
The MPI CEC investigates fundamental chemical processes in energy transformation and contributes to the development of new and efficient catalysts. It also works on ways to store energy via chemical reactions, extending the reach of renewable energy. Its approach to this problem is based on a profound understanding of the underlying chemical reactions and multidisciplinary.

== Departments ==
=== Inorganic Spectroscopy ===
Director: Serena DeBeer

The department of Inorganic Spectroscopy focuses on the development and application of advanced X-ray spectroscopic tools for understanding processes in biological and chemical catalysis.

==== Research groups ====
- Energy Converting Enzymes (James Birrell)
- Computational Chemistry (Ragnar Björnsson)
- Biochemistry of Metalloproteins (Laure Decamps)
- X-ray Spectroscopy Instrumentation (Sergey Peredkov)
- Chemical Synthesis (Christina Römelt)
- Proteins on electrodes (Olaf Rüdiger)
- Chemical Synthesis, X-ray structure analysis (Thomas Weyhermüller)

=== Molecular Catalysis ===
Director: Walter Leitner

The research of the Molecular Catalysis department focuses on the development of technologies for the conversion of renewable energy and feedstocks to sustainable fuels and chemical products.

==== Research groups ====
- Multifunctional Catalytic Systems (Alexis Bordet)
- Organometallic Electrocatalysis (Nicolas Kaeffer)
- Multiphase Catalysis (Andreas Vorholt)

=== Heterogeneous Reactions ===
Director: Robert Schlögl

The department of Heterogeneous Reactions is researching, among other things, on a better understanding of the processes of electrocatalytic water splitting. The aim is to generate generic insight and solutions for synthesis and analysis of chemical energy conversion systems.

==== Research groups ====
- Surface Structure Analysis (Mark Greiner)
- Carbon Synthesis and Applications (Saskia Heumann)
- Electrocatalysis (Anna Mechler)
- Catalytic Technology (Holger Ruland)

=== Independent Research Groups ===
- EPR Research Group (Alexander Schnegg)
- Catalyst Controlled Selective Transformations and Ligand Design (Manuel van Gemmeren)
- Synergistic Organometallic Catalysis (Christophe Werlé)

Wolfgang Lubitz from the Department of Biophysical Chemistry is an Emeritus Director at the Institute.

== History ==
As one of 84 institutes in the Max Planck Society, it was first part of the neighboring Max Planck Institute for Coal Research and became independent in 1981 under the name of Max Planck Institute for Radiation Chemistry. It was renamed to Max Planck Institute for Bioinorganic Chemistry in 2003, to reflect its changing research focus. Following a significant restructuring and expansion of its departments in 2011, it was re-established in 2012 as the Max Planck Institute for Chemical Energy Conversion.
