= Michelle Simmons =

British-Australian quantum physicist (born 1967)

Michelle Simmons AC FRS FAA FRSN FTSE
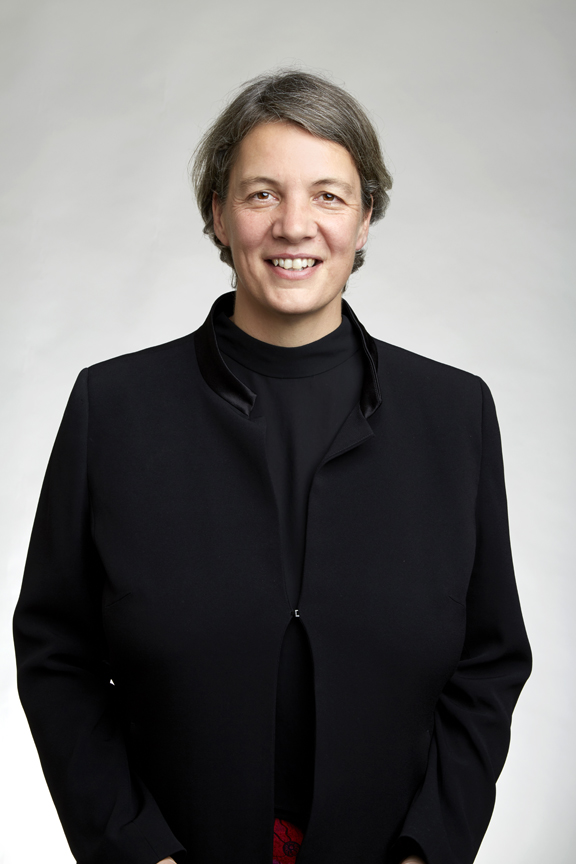
- Michelle Simmons at the Royal Society admissions day in London, July 2018
- Born: Michelle Yvonne Simmons; 14 July 1967 (age 59); London, United Kingdom
- Education: Durham University (PhD)
- Spouse: Thomas Barlow
- Children: 1 daughter; 2 sons
- Awards: Pawsey Medal (2005); Thomas Ranken Lyle Medal (2015); Eureka Prize (2015); Feynman Prize in Nanotechnology (2015); L'Oréal-UNESCO Awards for Women in Science (2017); Australian of the Year (2018); Companion of the Order of Australia (AC) (2026)
- Scientific career
- Fields: Quantum physics
- Workplaces: University of Cambridge; University of New South Wales; Sydney Grammar School
- Thesis: The characterisation of CdTe-based epitaxial solar cell structures fabricated by MOVPE (1992)
- Doctoral advisor: Andrew W. Brinkman
- Website: www.sqc.com/about

Michelle Yvonne Simmons (born 14 July 1967) is an Australian quantum physicist, recognised for her foundational contributions to the field of atomic electronics. She is the CEO and Founder of Silicon Quantum Computing.

Simmons is also the founding director of the Australian Research Council's Centre of Excellence for Quantum Computation & Communication Technology and, as of 2023, is Scientia Professor of Quantum Physics in the Faculty of Science at the University of New South Wales.

She has twice been an Australian Research Council Federation Fellow, and is an Australian Research Council Laureate Fellow. In January 2018, Simmons was named Australian of the Year for her work and dedication to quantum information science, and in June 2019, she was appointed an Officer of the Order of Australia in the Queen's Birthday Honours in recognition of her "distinguished service to science education as a leader in quantum and atomic electronics, and as a role model".

== Early life and education ==
Simmons was born on 14 July 1967 in London, to a mother who worked as a bank manager and a father who worked as a policeman. Simmons grew up in South-East London with an older brother.

Between 1985 and 1988 she undertook her undergraduate degree at Trevelyan College, Durham University, where she studied physics and chemistry of materials.

As a postgraduate at St Aidan's College, Durham she was awarded a PhD in 1992 for her thesis "The characterisation of CdTe-based epitaxial solar cell structures fabricated by MOVPE", with research supervised by Andrew W. Brinkman.

== Career and research ==
From 1992 to 1998 Simmons worked as a research fellow in quantum electronics with Michael Pepper at the Cavendish Laboratory in the UK, where she gained an international reputation for her work in the discovery of the 0.7 feature and the development of 'hole' transistors.

In 1999, she was awarded an Australian Research Council (ARC) QEII Fellowship and went to Australia, conducting research for four years under this fellowship. She was a founding member of the ARC Centre of Excellence for Quantum Computer Technology, and as of 2023 remains director of the centre.

Simmons founded Silicon Quantum Computing, a Sydney based quantum computing company, in 2017 and is the current CEO.

She has held several other positions over the course of her career, including:

- 2000: Director, Atomic Fabrication Facility, UNSW
- 2000: Manager, Atomic Fabrication and Crystal Growth Program, Centre for Quantum Computer Technology, School of Physics, UNSW
- 2003: Chair, New South Wales Branch, Australian Institute of Physics
- 2003: Member, C8 Commission, International Union of Pure and Applied Physics
- 2003: Australian Representative for Nanotechnology, International Union for Vacuum Science, Technique and Applications
- 2005: Member, Expert Advisory Committee for Physics, Chemistry and Geosciences, Australian Research Council
- 2007: Associate editor, IEEE Journal of Nanotechnology
- 2007: Chair, National Committee for Physics, Australian Academy of Science

As of 2023 Simmons is a Scientia Professor of Quantum Physics in the Faculty of Science at the University of New South Wales.

In 2025 Simmons was elected to the Board of Directors of the Tech Council of Australia.

=== Achievements ===
Simmons is well-known internationally for creating the field of atomic electronics, that is, building electronic devices at the atomic scale. Her research team at ARC created the first precision single atom transistor and the narrowest conducting wires in silicon, among other achievements.

Since 2000 she has established a large research group dedicated to the fabrication of atomic scale devices in silicon and germanium using the atomic precision of scanning tunnelling microscopy. Her research group is the only group worldwide that can create atomically precise devices in silicon—they were also the first team in the world to develop a working "perfect" single-atom transistor and the narrowest conducting doped wires in silicon.

== Publications and other activities ==
External videos
- Talk on quantum computation on YouTube, TEDx Sydney 2012

Simmons has published over 450 peer-reviewed journal papers, amassing over 13,000 citations, written five book chapters, and published a book on nanotechnology.

She has also filed 44 patents and delivered over 400 invited and plenary presentations at international conferences.

She was the inaugural editor-in-chief of npj Quantum Information, an academic journal publishing articles in the emerging field of quantum information science launched in 2015.

She gave the Australia Day address for New South Wales in 2017, in which she spoke about the importance of setting high expectations for students.

Simmons delivered the 2023 Boyer Lecture in four parts, titled The Atomic Revolution.

== Recognition and awards ==
- 1999: Australian Research Council QEII Fellowship
- 2004: Australian Research Council Federation Fellowship
- 2005: Australian Academy of Science's Pawsey Medal
- 2006: Fellow of the Australian Academy of Science (FAA)
- 2009: Australian Research Council Federation Fellowship
- 2011: NSW Scientist of the Year (named by the NSW Government Office of the Chief Scientist & Engineer)
- 2013: Australian Laureate Fellowship, Australian Research Council
- 2013: Royal Society of New South Wales Walter Burfitt Prize
- 2014: Fellow of the American Academy of Arts and Sciences
- 2015: Thomas Ranken Lyle Medal
- 2015: Fellow of the Australian Academy of Technological Sciences and Engineering (FTSE)
- 2015: Feynman Prize in Nanotechnology, Foresight Institute, for the fabrication of single-atom transistors
- 2015: Eureka Prize for Leadership in Science, CSIRO
- 2017: George R. Stibitz Computing Pioneer Award, American Computer Museum
- 2017: L'Oréal-UNESCO Awards for Women in Science Asia-Pacific Laureate
- 2017: Profiled in a short documentary on France24 TV
- 2018: Australian of the Year, for her work in quantum physics
- 2018: Fellow of the Royal Society (FRS)
- 2019: Officer of the Order of Australia (AO) as part of the 2019 Queen's Birthday Honours
- 2020: Chair, Division of Quantum Information, American Physical Society
- 2021: Fellow, American Physical Society
- 2022: Royal Society Bakerian Medal
- 2023: Prime Minister's Prize for Science
- 2023: Erna Hamburger Prize
- 2025: Elected as an Honorary Fellow of the Australian Institute of Physics
- 2026: Promoted to Companion of the Order of Australia in the 2026 Australia Day Honours.

As of 2017, Simmons was an elected trustee of Sydney Grammar School.

== Personal life and views ==
Simmons has resided in Australia since 1999, taking citizenship in 2007.

She is married to Thomas Barlow, formerly, a Financial Times columnist and a Fellow of MIT and Balliol College, Oxford, now a novelist and business analyst. They have three children. She says she enjoys "planning expeditions and keeping fit. But the thing that brings me the most joy is my funny husband and three adorable children".

Her heroes in science are Michael Faraday and Nobel Laureate John Bardeen.

=== Views on education ===
In her 2017 Australia Day address, Simmons criticised the lowering of standards in physics education in the HSC (Higher School Certificate) curriculum, in which an effort has been made to make physics more appealing to girls by substituting mathematical problem-solving with qualitative responses, remarking that the curriculum had a "feminised nature".

When Simmons was made Australian of the Year in 2018, she spoke about the importance of not being defined by other people's expectations of you. She said, "Don't live your life according to what other people think. Go out there and do what you really want to do". She is passionate about encouraging girls to pursue a career in science and technology. "Seeing women in leadership roles and competing internationally is important. It gives them the sense that anything is possible", she said.
