= Ferran Garcia-Pichel =

Ferran Garcia-Pichel is a microbiologist and an educator at Arizona State University, where he holds the position of Regents Professor and the Virginia Ullman Professorship for the Environment. He also serves as the Founding Director of the Center for Fundamental and Applied Microbiomics within the Biodesign Institute.

Garcia-Pichel's work has been cited more than 24,000 times in scientific publications, with a focus on the roles that Bacteria (e.g., Cyanobacteria) play in natural environments (e.g., desert soils), and on translating microbial discoveries to other disciplines and the applied science realm. Garcia-Pichel work has appeared in major scientific venues like Nature, Science, and PNAS.

== Early life and education ==
After completing a licenciatura (bachelor's degree) at the Autonomous University of Barcelona, he enrolled in graduate education at the University of Oregon on a Fulbright Program scholarship, graduating with master's (1988) and Ph.D. degrees (1992). He moved to the Max Planck Institute for Marine Microbiology to enter post-doctoral education, supported by a stipend from the Max Planck Society.

== Career ==
Continuing as a scientist at the Max Planck Institute for Marine Microbiology, he then joined Arizona State University as an assistant professor, where he is today. He has also worked as a visiting scholar at the University of Las Palmas de Gran Canaria, at the Institut de Ciènces del Mar (CSIC) in Barcelona, and at the Lawrence Berkeley National Laboratory.

== Awards and honors ==
Garcia-Pichel is an elected Fellow of the American Society for Microbiology, the Ecological Society of America, and the American Geophysical Union. He is an honorary member of the Sigma Delta Pi.
