= Jürg Stahl =

Swiss politician (born 1968)

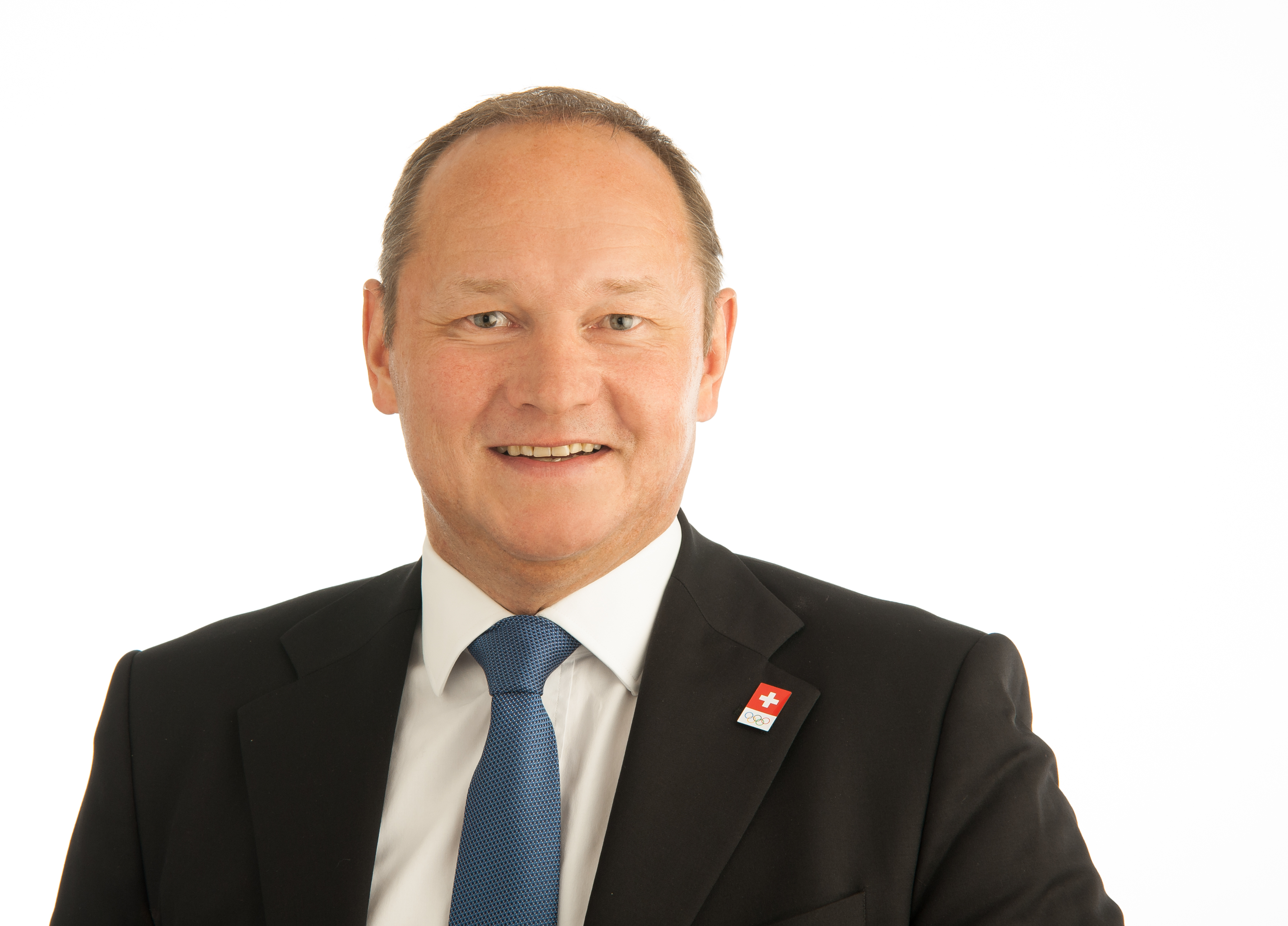

Member of the National Council
- In office 6 December 1999 – 2 June 2019

Personal details
- Born: 16 January 1968 (age 57); Winterthur, Switzerland
- Political party: Swiss People's Party
- Profession: Pharmacist

Jürg Stahl (born 16 January 1968, in Winterthur) is a Swiss politician of the Swiss People's Party. He was a member of the National Council for the canton of Zürich from 1999 to 2019 and served as the president of the National Council from 2016 to 2017.

== Biography ==
Stahl underwent advanced training as a pharmacist in Neuchâtel and graduated in 1992. He supplemented his education with a diploma in small business management at the University of St. Gallen. Between 1996 and 2004, Stahl ran a pharmacy in Winterthur. In 2004 he was elected as a member of the management board of the health insurance company Group Mutuel.

Stahl's career in politics began as a member of Winterthur's municipal council between 1994 and 2001. In 2001, he missed the election to Winterthur's "Stadtrat" (city executive) by a single vote.

Stahl was elected to the National Council in 1999 and reelected in 2003, 2007, 2011, and 2015. In 2016, Stahl was elected to succeed Christa Markwalder as president of the National Council, only days after he had been elected as president of Swiss Olympic (succeeding Jörg Schild). In June 2018, he accepted a position with Schweizerischen Drogistenverband, the Swiss druggists association.

He announced in February 2019 that he would not run for another term in the National Council. In 2020, Stahl was elected as the new president of the supervisory body of the Swiss National Science Foundation, replacing interim president Felicitas Pauss.

Stahl served in the Swiss Air Force with the rank of major. He is married and has a daughter.

| Preceded by Christa Markwalder | President of the National Council; 2016–2017 | Succeeded by Dominique de Buman |
