= Silicon Quantum Computing =

Australian quantum computing company

- Type: Private
- Industry: Quantum Computing
- Founded: 2017
- Headquarters: Sydney, Australia
- Key people: Michelle Simmons (CEO); Simon Segars (Chairman)
- Website: sqc.com

Silicon Quantum Computing Pty Ltd (SQC) is a Sydney, Australia-based quantum computing company.

The company develops quantum computers and analogue quantum devices using phosphorus atoms manufactured within silicon using scanning tunnelling microscopes, an approach within the field of spin qubits.

Distinct from other companies within the spin qubits modality, SQC uses the nuclear spin of phosphorus atoms placed within isotopically pure Si-28 wafers for quantum computation. Atoms used as qubits have demonstrated favourable performance indicators such as long coherence times and biased noise.

== History ==
SQC was founded by Michelle Simmons in 2017. She is recognised for her foundational contributions to the field of atomic electronics. The company is chaired by Simon Segars the former Chief Executive Officer (CEO) of ARM Holdings PLC.

At incorporation, the company raised A$83 million from the Australian Federal Government, the New South Wales Government, the University of New South Wales, Telstra and the Commonwealth Bank of Australia.

== Manufacturing and technology ==
SQC uses phosphorus atoms precision-placed within pure silicon (Si-28) to create qubits. The company manufactures their own quantum computing chips (QPUs) with sub-nanometre (atom level) precision at their Sydney headquarters.

Simmons' research group, prior to the incorporation of SQC, created the first single atom transistor in 2012. SQC created the 3D atom transistor in 2019 and an integrated circuit made with atomic precision in 2022.

Grover's algorithm is one of the two foundational quantum algorithms (alongside Shor's algorithm). Grover's algorithm runs quadratically faster than the best possible classical algorithm for the same task, a linear search, and so has significant commercial relevance for optimisation problems. In 2025, SQC announced results of running Grover's on one of their quantum computing systems and achieving 98.87% of the theoretical maximum. This result was achieved without error correction.

== Products ==
SQC manufactures three products. Two application-specific processors within the family of quantum analogue processors and one series of quantum computers.

- Quantum Machine Learning, "Watermelon"
- Molecular Simulation, "Quantum Twins" within the field of quantum chemistry and surface science
- Error corrected quantum computing processors, "Jalapeño"

In August 2025, Australian Defence announced the purchase of a QML processor to be housed on-premises within their data environment.

== See also ==
- Quantum computing
- Cloud-based quantum computing
- Quantum machine learning
- Surface science
- Quantum chemistry
- Quantum error correction
