= Daniela Landert =

Swiss linguist

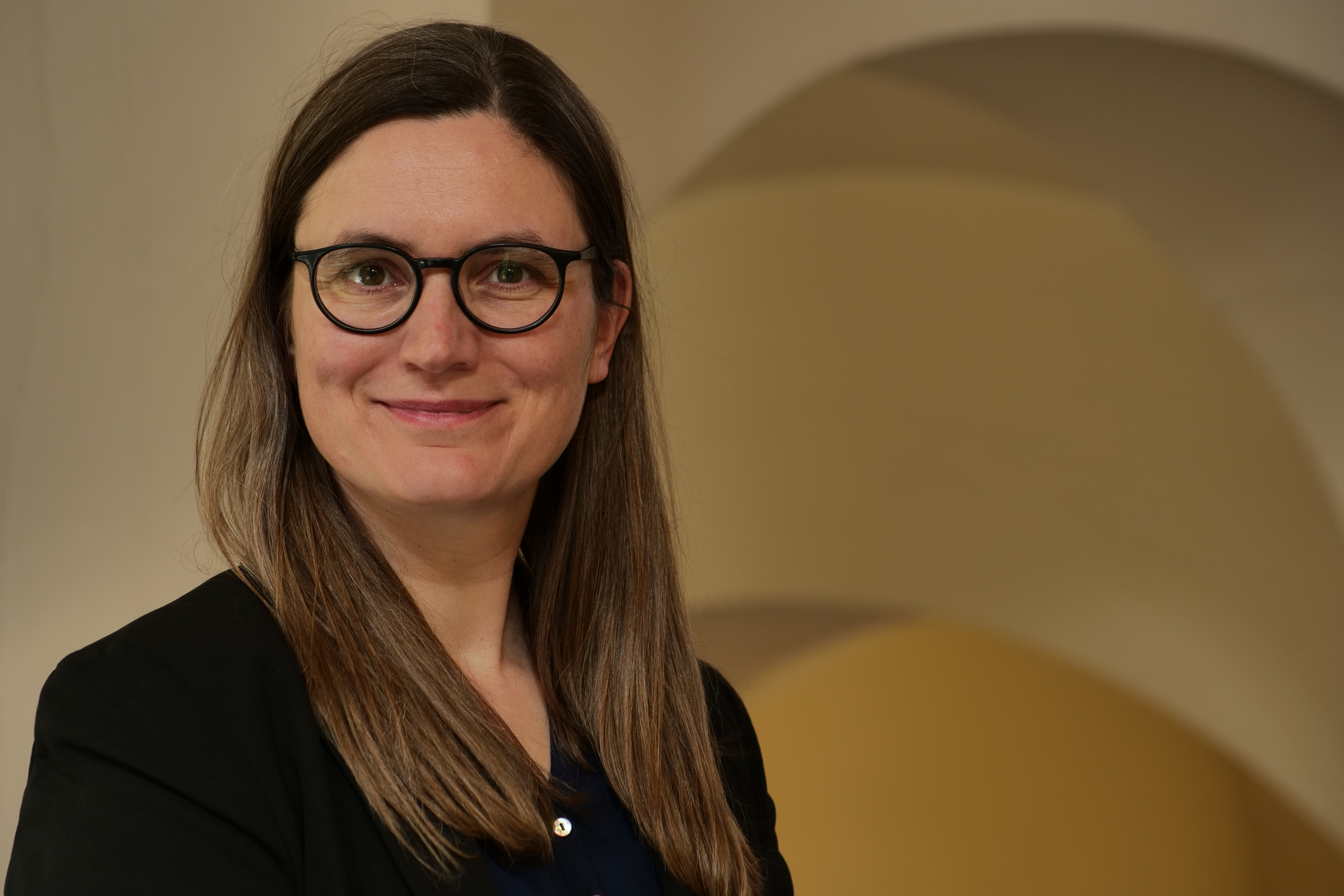
- Landert at Heidelberg University, 2022
- Awards: SNSF PRIMA grant

Academic background
- Education: University of Zurich

Academic work
- Discipline: Linguistics
- Sub-discipline: Pragmatics
- Institutions: Heidelberg University; University of Basel; University of Zurich
- Main interests: Historical pragmatics; corpus pragmatics; pragmatics of fiction; spontaneity in spoken language
- Notable works: Personalisation in Mass Media Communication (2014); Corpus Pragmatics (2023); Methods in Historical Corpus Pragmatics (2024)

Daniela Landert is a Swiss linguist and Professor of English Linguistics at Heidelberg University. Her research spans pragmatics, including historical and corpus pragmatics, the pragmatics of fiction, and spontaneity in spoken interaction. She has served as editor of the peer-reviewed Journal of Historical Pragmatics since 2022, received a PRIMA career grant from the Swiss National Science Foundation (SNSF), and her 2024 monograph has been reviewed in multiple scholarly journals.

== Early life and education ==
Landert studied English linguistics at the University of Zurich, where she completed her doctorate and later her Habilitation.

== Career ==
Following posts at Zurich and the University of Basel, Landert led the SNSF-funded PRIMA project The Pragmatics of Improvised Drama Comedy. In 2022 she was appointed Professor of English Linguistics at Heidelberg University, and she delivered her inaugural lecture in July 2024.

== Research ==
Landert’s work combines methods from historical linguistics and corpus linguistics to examine epistemic stance and modality in Early Modern English, the pragmatics of scripted and improvised fiction, and how spontaneity shapes interactional practices.

== Editorial work ==
Since 2022 Landert has served as editor of the Journal of Historical Pragmatics (John Benjamins).

== Grants and recognition ==
In 2019 Landert was awarded a PRIMA career grant by the SNSF. The project began in February 2020 and later moved from Basel to Heidelberg with her appointment. She was invited as a plenary speaker at ISLE 8 (International Society for the Linguistics of English) in September 2025.

== Publications ==
=== Books ===
- Landert, Daniela (2014). Personalisation in Mass Media Communication: British online news between public and private. Pragmatics & Beyond New Series. Vol. 240. De Gruyter Brill (John Benjamins). doi:10.1075/pbns.240. ISBN 978-90-272-5645-4.
- Landert, Daniela; Dayter, Daria; Messerli, Thomas C.; Locher, Miriam A. (2023). Corpus Pragmatics (Elements in Pragmatics). Cambridge University Press. doi:10.1017/9781009091107. ISBN 978-1-009-09110-7.
- Landert, Daniela (2024). Methods in Historical Corpus Pragmatics: Epistemic Stance in Early Modern English (Studies in English Language). Cambridge University Press. doi:10.1017/9781009237369. ISBN 978-1-009-23736-9.

=== Selected articles and chapters ===
- Landert, Daniela (2021). “The spontaneous co-creation of comedy: Humour in improvised theatrical fiction.” Journal of Pragmatics 173: 68–87. doi:10.1016/j.pragma.2020.12.007.

=== Reception ===
Landert’s 2024 monograph has been reviewed in Corpus Pragmatics, ICAME Journal, and Corpora. Her 2023 open-access Element Corpus Pragmatics has also received reviews.

== Invited talks ==
- Plenary lecture, ISLE 8, Santiago de Compostela, September 2025.
