= Erna Hamburger =

Swiss engineer (1911–1988)

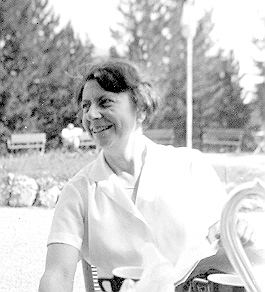
- Erna Hamburger in 1962
- Born: 14 September 1911; Brussels, Belgium
- Died: 15 May 1988 (aged 76)
- Employer: EPFL
- Known for: First woman in Swiss history to be named professor at a STEM university
- Notable work: Apparatus for radio-wave reception
- Movement: Early leader in global feminism

Erna Hamburger (14 September 1911 – 15 May 1988) was a Swiss engineer and professor. In 1957, she became professor of electrometry at the University of Lausanne. She was the first woman in the history of Switzerland to be named a professor at a STEM university.

== Early life and education ==
Hamburger was born on 14 September 1911, in Brussels, Belgium to Frederick and Else Müller. She went to secondary school in Kissingen, Bavaria. She first started secondary school at an all-girls' school, and then moved on to be the only girl in her engineering classes. In 1933, Hamburger received an engineering-electrician diploma from the École Polytechnique Fédérale de Lausanne. Hamburger also received a doctorate in technical sciences from the same school in 1936.

== Career ==
In 1942, Hamburger was employed as an electrical engineer at Paillard SA in Sainte-Croix, Switzerland. Before becoming a professor at the University of Lausanne, Hamburger was the head of work at the electrotechnical laboratory at École Polytechnique Fédérale de Lausanne.

In 1957, Hamburger was appointed as the first woman in the history of Switzerland to be named professor at École Polytechnique Fédérale de Lausanne. When this occurred, the president of the school, Maurice Cosandey, announced, "It is both a brilliant consecration and a measure of the backwardness that characterizes our country as regards the promotion of women."

Other positions Hamburger held include president of the Swiss Association of Women in Liberal and Commercial Careers, president of the Association of University Women of Vaud, and vice president of the International Federation of University Women.

One of her major innovations was the creation of an apparatus for radio-wave reception. This research included topics such as a system of optical registration from tone frequencies and ultra-short waves.

Hamburger joined the Swiss military in 1939 and was promoted to chief of the telecommunication troops in 1950.

== Legacy ==
Hamburger was an advocate for higher education. Shortly after her death, the Swiss Federal Institute of Technology in Lausanne Women in Science and Humanities Foundation was created. The primary goal of this foundation is to promote and support women in higher education. Every year, the Erna Hamburger Prize is awarded to "the most influential woman in science" that year.

Laureates of the Erna Hamburger Prize
Year	Laureate	Impact in STEM
2006	Julia Higgins	Chemical engineer
2007	Christiane Nüsslein-Volhard	Biologist and Nobel Prize winner
2008	Frances E. Allen	Computer scientist and IBM Fellow Emerita
2009	Kazuyo Sejima	Architect and Pritzker Prize winner
2010	Lisa Randall	Physicist
2011	Ada Yonath	Biologist and Nobel Prize winner
2012	Felicitas Pauss	Physicist at ETH Zurich
2013	Julia King, Baroness Brown of Cambridge	British engineer
2014	Esther Duflo	Economist
2015	Jill Farrant	Phytologist
2016	May-Britt Moser	Psychologist and Neuroscientist, winner of 2014 Nobel Prize
2017	Mary O'Kane	Australian scientist and engineer
2018	Jennifer Widom	Electrical engineering and computing
2019	Antje Boetius	Marine Biologist and Geomicrobiology Professor
2020	Michal Lipson	Physicist, in silicon photonics
2021	Sarah Gilbert	Vacinologist
2022	Anne Lacaton	Architect and educator
2023	Michelle Simmons	Quantum physicist
2024	Rosa Menéndez López	Chemistry, materials science and engineering development for new carbon materials
2025	Rose Mutiso	Climate resilient energy solutions

- 2026 - Margo Seltzer
