= Nicole Dubilier =

American marine biologist

Nicole Dubilier is a marine microbiologist and director of the Symbiosis Department at the Max Planck Institute for Marine Microbiology since 2013 and a professor of microbial symbioses at the University of Bremen. She is a pioneer in ecological and evolutionary symbiotic relationships between sea animals and their microbial partners inhabiting environments that harbour low nutrient concentrations. She was responsible for the discovery of a new form of symbiosis between two kinds of bacteria and the marine oligochaete Olavius algarvensis.

== Early life ==
Born in New York City to an American industrialist father and German immigrant mother, Nicole Dubilier initially focused on ballet. In 1970, she was accepted into the Stuttgart Ballet company after childhood success with The Royal Ballet alongside Rudolf Nureyev. Due to her parents' divorce earlier that year, Dubilier declined the offer to remain with her mother and three younger brothers in Wiesbaden, Germany. Initially intending to join the Hessian State Ballet, Dubilier ultimately chose to quit ballet and continue her education. She decided to pursue marine biology based on her experiences visiting her father each summer in Fire Island Pines, New York.

== Career ==
In 1985, Dubilier obtained her degree in Zoology, Biochemistry and Microbiology and completed her Ph.D. in marine biology at the University of Hamburg with Olav Giere in 1992. During her graduate studies, she found herself dispassionate about her research, often wanting to quit, but her persistence propelled her to the finishline. In 1992, motivated to re-discover the excitement of her field, Dubilier attended a molecular biology summer course taught by Donald Manahan at University of Southern California. Later, from 1993–1995, she experienced her first post-doc with the guidance of Colleen Cavanaugh on hydrothermal vents chemosynthetic life forms. Two years later, she started her career at the Max Planck Institute for Marine Microbiology (MPI-MM), first as a postdoc studying the evolution of bacterial symbiosis in gutless worms (1997–2001) and afterwards as the coordinator of the MPI-MM International Research Program (2002–2017), head of the Symbiosis Laboratory (2001–2017) and the head of the Symbiosis Department (since 2013). Dubilier has continued her work on symbiotic relationships within chemosynthetic living organisms, expanding her exploration of both shallow and deep-sea environments, ranging from seagrass to coastal sediments, through meta-omic approaches, e.g. metaproteomics and metagenomics. Her primary animal models constitute of shrimp, gutless-worms, nematodes, and ciliates.

== Awards and honors ==
- 2009 Gordon Research Conference (GRC) Applied and Environmental Microbiology Chapter
- 2013 Gordon and Betty Moore Foundation Marine Microbiology Initiative Award
- 2014 German Research Foundation Gottfried Wilhelm Leibniz Prize
- 2017 Co-Chair American Society for Microbiology Microbe Conference
- 2018 Elected member of European Molecular Biology Organization
- 2019 Plymouth Marine Science Medal Lecture
- 2020 Excellence Professor Award of the Petersen Foundation

_2025 D.C White Award for Interdisciplinary research from the American Society for Microbiology

- Since 2013 Elected member at the American Academy of Microbiology
- Since 2020 President of the International Society of Microbial Ecology

== Selected publications ==
- Dubilier, Nicole; McFall-Ngai, Margaret; Zhao, Liping (29 October 2015). "Microbiology: Create a global microbiome effort". Nature News. 526 (7575): 631–634. Bibcode:2015Natur.526..631D. doi:10.1038/526631a. PMID 26511562.
- McFall-Ngai, Margaret; Hadfield, Michael G.; Bosch, Thomas C. G.; Carey, Hannah V.; Domazet-Lošo, Tomislav; Douglas, Angela E.; Dubilier, Nicole; Eberl, Gerard; Fukami, Tadashi; Gilbert, Scott F.; Hentschel, Ute; King, Nicole; Kjelleberg, Staffan; Knoll, Andrew H.; Kremer, Natacha; Mazmanian, Sarkis K.; Metcalf, Jessica L.; Nealson, Kenneth; Pierce, Naomi E.; Rawls, John F.; Reid, Ann; Ruby, Edward G.; Rumpho, Mary; Sanders, Jon G.; Tautz, Diethard; Wernegreen, Jennifer J. (7 February 2013). "Animals in a bacterial world, a new imperative for the life sciences". Proceedings of the National Academy of Sciences. 110 (9): 3229–3236. Bibcode:2013PNAS..110.3229M. doi:10.1073/pnas.1218525110. ISSN 0027-8424. PMC 3587249. PMID 23391737.
- Dubilier, Nicole; Bergin, Claudia; Lott, Christian (2008). "Symbiotic diversity in marine animals: the art of harnessing chemosynthesis". Nature Reviews Microbiology. 6 (10). Springer Science and Business Media LLC: 725–740. doi:10.1038/nrmicro1992. ISSN 1740-1526. PMID 18794911. S2CID 3622420.
- Woyke, Tanja; Teeling, Hanno; Ivanova, Natalia N.; Huntemann, Marcel; Richter, Michael; Gloeckner, Frank Oliver; Boffelli, Dario; Anderson, Iain J.; Barry, Kerrie W.; Shapiro, Harris J.; Szeto, Ernest; Kyrpides, Nikos C.; Mussmann, Marc; Amann, Rudolf; Bergin, Claudia; Ruehland, Caroline; Rubin, Edward M.; Dubilier, Nicole (17 September 2006). "Symbiosis insights through metagenomic analysis of a microbial consortium". Nature. 443 (7114). Springer Science and Business Media LLC: 950–955. Bibcode:2006Natur.443..950W. doi:10.1038/nature05192. ISSN 0028-0836. PMID 16980956. S2CID 140106758.
- Dubilier, Nicole; Mülders, Caroline; Ferdelman, Tim; de Beer, Dirk; Pernthaler, Annelie; Klein, Michael; Wagner, Michael; Erséus, Christer; Thiermann, Frank; Krieger, Jens; Giere, Olav; Amann, Rudolf (1 May 2001). "Endosymbiotic sulphate-reducing and sulphide-oxidizing bacteria in an oligochaete worm". Nature. 411 (6835). Springer Science and Business Media LLC: 298–302. Bibcode:2001Natur.411..298D. doi:10.1038/35077067. ISSN 0028-0836. PMID 11357130. S2CID 4420931.
