= Rose Mutiso =

Kenyan energy researcher

- Mutiso in 2019
- Born: Nairobi, Kenya
- Education: Dartmouth College (BA, BE); University of Pennsylvania (PhD)
- Scientific career
- Fields: Energy development
- Workplaces: Energy for Growth Hub, Research Director
- Doctoral advisor: Karen I. Winey

Rose M. Mutiso is a Kenyan activist and materials scientist. She is co-founder and CEO of The Mawazo Institute. She is the research director of the Energy for Growth Hub. She was short listed for the 2020 Pritzker Emerging Environmental Genius Award. Mutiso received the 2025 Erna Hamburger Award for her research into climate resilient energy solutions.

== Education ==
Mutiso attended engineering school at Dartmouth College, before completing her PhD in Materials Science at the University of Pennsylvania in the lab of Karen I. Winey. Her dissertation focused material properties for nanoelectronics. She did her postdoc as a 2013-14 congressional science fellow with the American Institute of Physics.

== Career ==
Mutiso was a fellow in the U.S. Department of Energy. She was Energy and Innovation Policy Fellow in the office of Senator Chris Coons (as part of her postdoc).

Mutiso's activism work focuses on improving energy access in Africa in a climate-conscious way. Through the Mawazo Institute she hopes to train more women in the research and engineering skills necessary to further develop the Kenyan energy sector. She served on the advisory board for African Utility Week 2018. She has advocated for international carbon budgeting that recognizes both the comparatively low current emissions of African nations and allots space for their future development into higher energy consumptions. She has written for Scientific American and also given a TED talk on the topic.
