= Antje Boetius =

German biologist (born 1967)

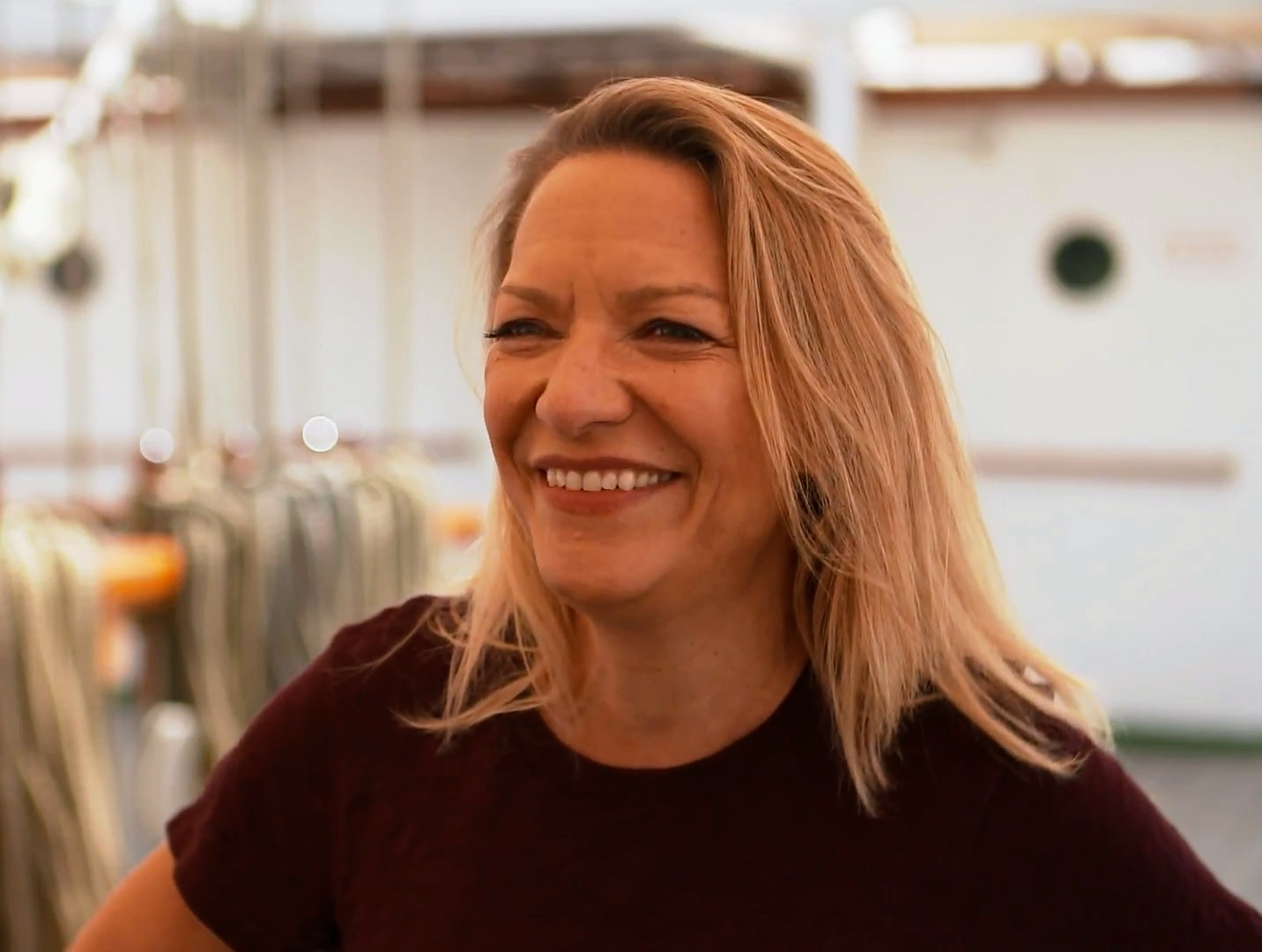
- Boetius in 2018
- Born: 5 March 1967 (age 59); Frankfurt am Main, West Germany (now Germany)
- Education: University of Hamburg
- Awards: Gottfried Wilhelm Leibniz Prize; Gustav-Steinmann-Medaille (2014)
- Scientific career
- Fields: Marine biology
- Workplaces: University of Bremen

Antje Boetius (born 5 March 1967) is a German marine biologist. She is a professor of geomicrobiology at the Max Planck Institute for Marine Microbiology, University of Bremen. Boetius received the Gottfried Wilhelm Leibniz Prize in March 2009 for her study of sea bed microorganisms that affect the global climate. She has been the director of Germany's polar research hub, the Alfred Wegener Institute, since 2017. In May 2025 she became president and CEO of the Monterey Bay Aquarium Research Institute.

Boetius was the first person to describe anaerobic oxidation of methane, and believes the Earth's earliest life forms may have subsisted on methane in the absence of molecular oxygen (instead reducing oxygen-containing compounds such as nitrate or sulfate). She has also suggested such life forms may be able to reduce the rate of climate change in future. She is one of the laureates of the 2018 Environment Prize (German Environment Foundation) Boetius also won the Erna Hamburger Prize in 2019.

== Career ==
Boetius received her biology degree from the University of Hamburg in 1992. Prior to undertaking graduate research, she spent time at the Scripps Institution of Oceanography in Southern California, where she drew inspiration from marine microbiologists including Farooq Azam. While at Scripps, Boetius worked with sediments collected from the Clarion-Clipperton fracture zone, examining the small seafloor animals (copepods, nematodes) therein, but ultimately decided to study even smaller organisms: microbes.

Boetius carried out her doctorate research in biology advised by Victor Smetacek, working to create the field she ultimately wanted to study: deep-sea environmental microbiology. While working on her doctoral research, she undertook fourteen deep-sea expeditions across the Seven Seas. She earned a doctor of philosophy (PhD) from the University of Bremen in 1996, publishing a dissertation titled "Mikrobieller enzymatischer Abbau organischer Substanzen in Tiefseesedimenten" (Microbial enzymatic degradation of organic substances in deep sea sediments).

Boetius joined the Max Planck Institute for Marine Microbiology as a postdoctoral researcher, and became an assistant professor in 2001 and an associate professor in 2003. Her research interests are in the marine methane cycle, the ecology of chemosynthetic habitats, microbial processes of early diagenesis in deep-sea sediments, pressure and temperature effects on microbial processes, microbial symbiosis, geomicrobiology and the global carbon cycle. In addition to her role as Professor of Geomicrobiology, which she has held since March 2009, she is also leader of the HGF-MPG Bridge Group on Deep Sea Ecology and Technology and leader of the "Microbial Habitat Group" that researches biogeochemistry, transport processes and microbial processes in benthic environments. She took over as director of the Alfred Wegener Institute in November 2017.

Boetius is also engaged in research and conversations around "issues of deep-sea ecosystems, biodiversity, and our vision of how to live with a future ocean". Recent projects examine the interplay between deep-sea mining, ecology, and sustainability. Of deep-sea mining research published in the journal Science Advances in April 2020, Boetius has said "our experiment really shows that such physical processes will stop animals and microbes from returning to repopulate that habitat" and has, relatedly, cited the need to "test if there are ways to make deep-sea mining somewhat sustainable, for example, by creating a protected area for each exploited area".

== Awards ==
- 2025 Pour le Mérite for Sciences and Arts
- 2025 Foreign Member of the Royal Society
- 2019 Erna Hamburger Prize
- 2019 Robert L. and Bettie P. Cody Award in Ocean Sciences, Scripps Institute of Oceanography
- 2018 elected to Academia Europaea
- 2018 Environment Prize (German Environment Foundation)
- 2018 Vernadsky Medal, European Geosciences Union
- 2009 Gottfried Wilhelm Leibniz Prize

== Personal life ==
Boetius grew up in Frankfurt, Germany, and took frequent vacations to the seaside as a child. She spent time in Southern California while studying and working at Scripps Institution of Oceanography.

Mission Medico describe her interests as la bonne cuisine, le bon vin, la bonne compagnie, la bonne musique, la mode et la vie citadine ('Good food, good wine, good company, good music, fashion and city life').

Her grandfather Eduard Boëtius worked as a navigator on the Hindenburg zeppelin and was one of the few surviving crew members of the Lakehurst disaster.
