= John Buchanan (oil executive) =

New Zealand scientist

Sir John Buchanan
- Born: John Gordon St Clair Buchanan; 9 June 1943; Auckland, New Zealand
- Died: 13 July 2015 (aged 72)
- Education: University of Auckland (BSc, MSc, PhD
- Occupations: Businessman; chemist
- Years active: 1970–2014
- Known for: Former CFO of BP
- Children: 2

Sir John Gordon St Clair Buchanan (9 June 1943 – 13 July 2015) was a New Zealand-born scientist and director.

Buchanan was born in Auckland in June 1943 and grew up in Papatoetoe. He received his education at Auckland Grammar School and at the University of Auckland (BSc, MSc, PhD in Chemistry), and at Oxford and Harvard Universities. The title of this 1967 doctoral thesis at Auckland University was The Clemmensen reduction of 1,4-diketones and diterpenoid transformations.

Buchanan joined BP in 1970, where he progressed through the ranks and eventually was appointed by John Browne, Baron Browne of Madingley as the group's top finance executive, which caused surprise given that his background is in science and not in accountancy. He retired from BP in 2002, as the company has a strict retirement policy set at 60 years. For the next 12 years, Buchanan was with BHP, where he was an independent director (1 February 2003 to July 2015). He was a director of Alliance Boots (December 1997 to 2003). He was deputy chairman of Vodafone (25 July 2006 to 24 July 2012). He was chairman of ARM Holdings (3 May 2012 until 1 May 2014). and a director of AstraZeneca (25 April 2002 to 29 April 2010).

Buchanan became chairman of Smith & Nephew in April 2006 and remained in that position until his death. He was chairman of the UK chapter of the International Chamber of Commerce from May 2008 until his death. Following the 2011 Christchurch earthquake, he was founding chairman of the Christchurch Earthquake Appeal Trust UK that he set up with the help of the New Zealand High Commission in London.

In the 2012 New Year Honours, Buchanan was knighted for his services to industry. Buchanan had pancreatic cancer from about 2011. He became unwell in late 2014 and relinquished some of his roles.

Buchanan died on 13 July 2015 and was survived by his wife, son, and daughter.
