= Warren East =

British businessman and engineer (born 1961)

Sir Warren East CBE FRS FREng FIET FBCS
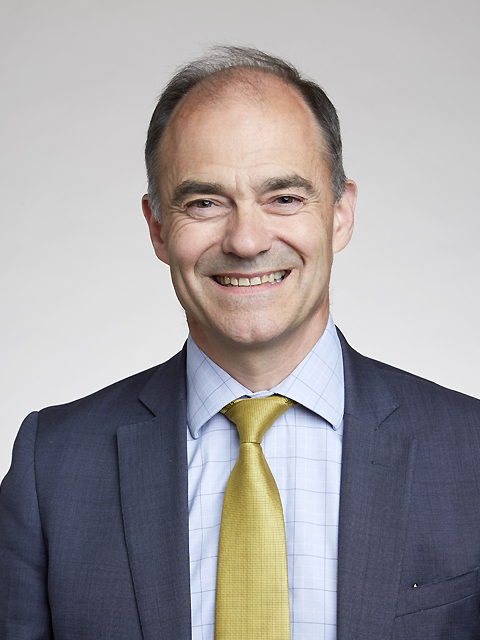
- East in 2017
- Born: 27 October 1961 (age 64)
- Education: Monmouth School; Wadham College, Oxford (BA); Cranfield University (MBA)
- Occupation: Chief executive officer
- Employers: Rolls-Royce Holdings; ARM Holdings; Texas Instruments
- Spouse: Amanda East
- Children: 3

Sir David Warren Arthur East (born 27 October 1961) is a British businessman and engineer. He is a former chief executive officer (CEO) of Rolls-Royce Holdings, a leading UK-based engine manufacturer, and previously held senior positions at ARM Holdings and Texas Instruments.

== Education ==
East attended Monmouth School and earned a bachelor's degree in engineering science from Wadham College, Oxford. He went on to earn a Master of Business Administration (MBA) degree from Cranfield School of Management at Cranfield University.

== Career ==
After eleven years with the chip maker Texas Instruments, East left in 1994 to join ARM Holdings, the British fabless manufacturing microprocessor design and software company. At ARM he established the company's consulting business.

East later became the vice-president of business operations at ARM. Within three years he was appointed to the board as chief operating officer. East was appointed the chief executive officer of ARM Holdings in October 2001. He moved on from ARM on 1 July 2013, and was succeeded by Simon Segars.

In 2014, East became a non-executive director of Rolls-Royce Holdings and chair of the board's technology committee. In April 2015, Rolls-Royce announced that East would succeed John Rishton as CEO, when Rishton retired on 2 July. East led Rolls-Royce through a turbulent period involving the impact of the COVID-19 pandemic impact on Global Aviation, increased pressure to transition to net zero, and in-service issues relating to the Trent 1000. After 7 years leading Rolls-Royce, he retired from the company at the end of 2022.

In January 2020, Warren East was appointed to the board of ASML Holding.

In April 2024, East was appointed the Chair of NATS Holdings, a public-private partnership that provides air traffic control services to flights within the UK.

== Honours and awards ==
East was appointed Commander of the Order of the British Empire (CBE) in the 2014 New Year Honours, for services to the technology industry. He was elected a fellow of the Royal Academy of Engineering in 2007 and a distinguished fellow of the British Computer Society (DFBCS) in 2013. Also in 2013, he presented the Higginson Lecture at Durham University. In 2017, he became a fellow of the Royal Society. He is a companion of the Chartered Management Institute (CCMI). East was awarded an honorary doctorate by the University of Bath in July 2018. He was awarded an honorary degree by Loughborough University in 2023. East was knighted in the 2025 New Year Honours, for services to the technology industry.

== Personal life ==
East is married with three children and lives in Cambridgeshire. His wife, Amanda, is a fellow engineer. East enjoys sailing, cycling, skiing and mountain walking, and plays the organ at his local church.
