= Rudolf Amann =

German microbiologist

Rudolf Amann (born 1961 in Rott am Inn/Germany) is a German microbiologist, Professor of Microbial Ecology at the University of Bremen and Director of the Max Planck Institute for Marine Microbiology (MPI-MM) in Bremen, where he heads the Department of Molecular Ecology.

== Biography ==
Amann studied biology and chemistry at the Technical University of Munich (Germany) where he earned his doctorate in 1988 under Karl-Heinz Schleifer. He subsequently moved to the University of Illinois at Urbana-Champaign (USA) to work with David A. Stahl and completed his habilitation in 1995 at the Technical University of Munich on the identification of previously uncultivable microorganisms. Since then, Amann has conducted research at the interface of ecology and taxonomy.

Between 1997 and 2001, Amann led a Max Planck Research Group at the Max Planck Institute for Marine Microbiology in Bremen. In 2001, he became a Scientific Member of the Max Planck Society, Head of the Department of Microbial Ecology, and Director at the institute. In the same year, he was appointed Professor of Microbial Ecology at the University of Bremen. From 2002 to 2018, Amann served as spokesperson for the International Max Planck Research School for Marine Microbiology (IMPRS MarMic), and from 2014 to 2017 he was Chair of the Biological–Medical Section of the Max Planck Society. Since 2023, he has been a member of the extended Executive Committee of the Max Planck Society, responsible for the department construction, and in the same year he was appointed to the Senate of the Leibniz Association.

== Research focus ==
Amann studies the diversity and ecology of marine microorganisms.

A major focus of his work is the development and application of molecular techniques for the identification and quantification of bacteria and archaea, particularly fluorescence in situ hybridization (FISH). These methods, based on specific nucleic acid probes, have made a substantial contribution to the discovery and characterization of numerous previously uncultivable microorganisms.

Amann investigates the role of microbial communities in global biogeochemical cycles, especially the oceanic carbon cycle, both in marine sediments and in the water column. Together with his group, he also studies interactions between phytoplankton and bacterioplankton, particularly during algal blooms, in which algal polysaccharides serve as an important energy source for heterotrophic bacteria. His research group is primarily active in two regions: the German Bight near the island of Heligoland and the Arctic archipelago of Svalbard.

Current work in his group combines ecological field studies with modern genomic, metagenomic, and metatranscriptomic approaches as well as bioinformatic analyses. In this context, the group also participates in international programs for the global study of marine microorganisms, such as TARA Oceans. In addition, Amann advocates an integrative taxonomy that links genetic, organismal, and ecological data in order to better understand microbial biodiversity in the context of ecosystems.

== Publications ==
Amann is the author or co-author of more than 460 scientific publications, which, according to Web of Science (as of 2025), have received over 80,000 citations. His h-index is 136.

Amann is listed among the Highly Cited Researchers in the field of microbiology in 2025. The analysis by Clarivate Analytics identifies researchers who have published the largest number of highly cited papers over the past ten years. Previously, he was named a Highly Cited Researcher Cross-Field multiple times (2018, 2022, 2023).

A complete list of Amann’s publications is available, for example, via ORCID.

== Memberships, positions and honors ==
In 2007, Amann was elected a member of the German National Academy of Sciences Leopoldina. He serves as a reviewer primarily for the German Research Foundation and the European Research Council (ERC). He is a co-editor of the journal Systematic and Applied Microbiology. In 2023, Amann was appointed to the Senate of the Leibniz Association.

Amann’s scientific honors include, among others, the Körber European Science Prize (1995) and the Bergey Award (in recognition of outstanding contributions to bacterial taxonomy) from the Bergey’s Manual Trust (2004).
