= Rene Haas =

American businessman

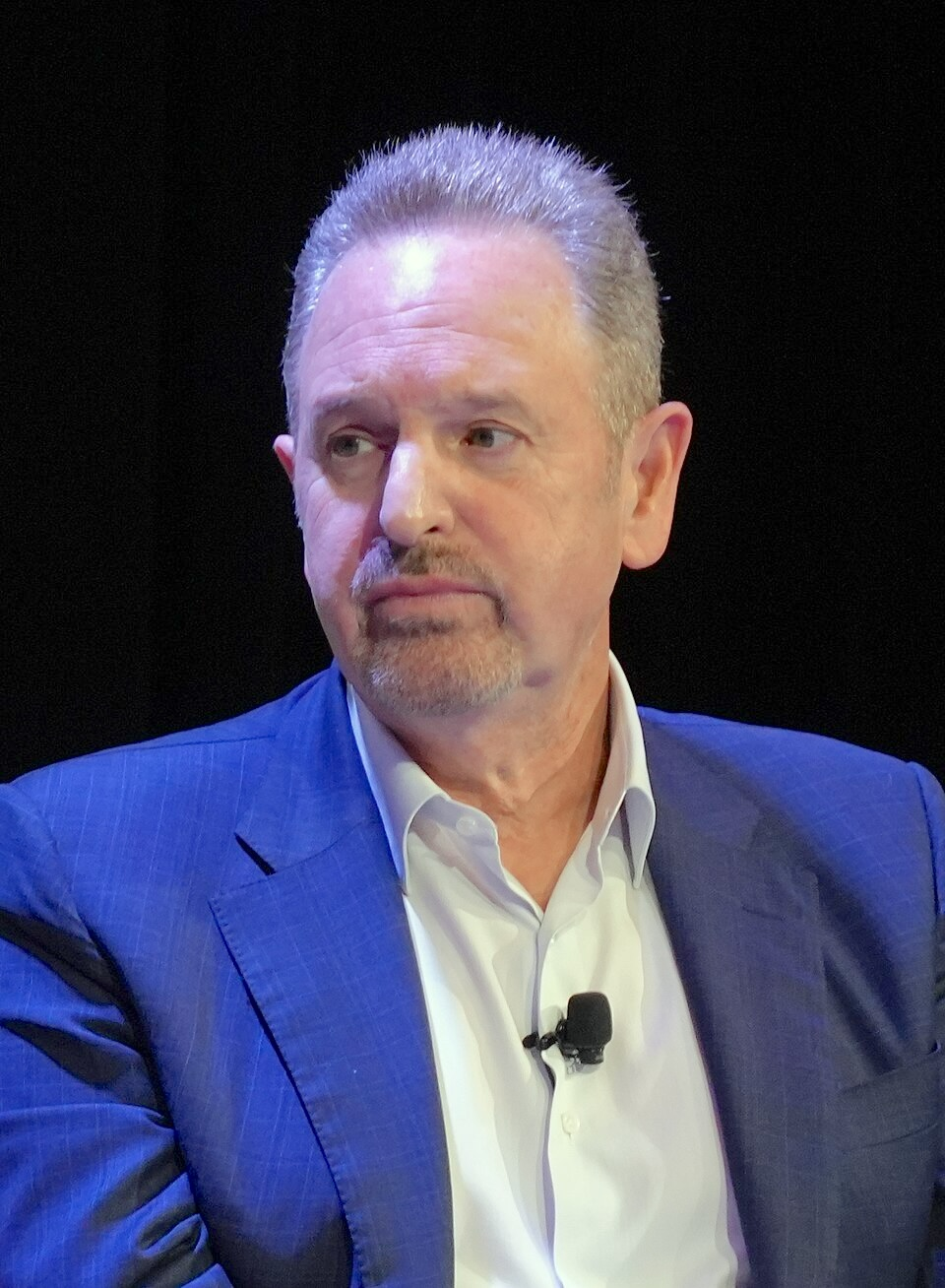
- Haas at SXSW 2025
- Born: Rene Anthony Andrada Haas; July 1962 (age 64)
- Education: Clarkson University (BS)
- Title: CEO, Arm Holdings
- Term: February 2022 –
- Board member of: Computacenter

Rene Anthony Andrada Haas (born 1962) is an American business executive who has been chief executive officer of Arm Holdings since February 2022. Haas is based in California while the company headquarters are in Cambridge, UK.

== Early life and education ==
Haas was born to a German-Jewish father who worked as a research scientist at Xerox and a Portuguese mother. He was raised in a suburb of Rochester, New York. In 1984, Haas completed his bachelor's degree in electrical engineering from Clarkson University in upstate New York. He also did an Executive Education Program from the Stanford Graduate School of Business.

== Career ==
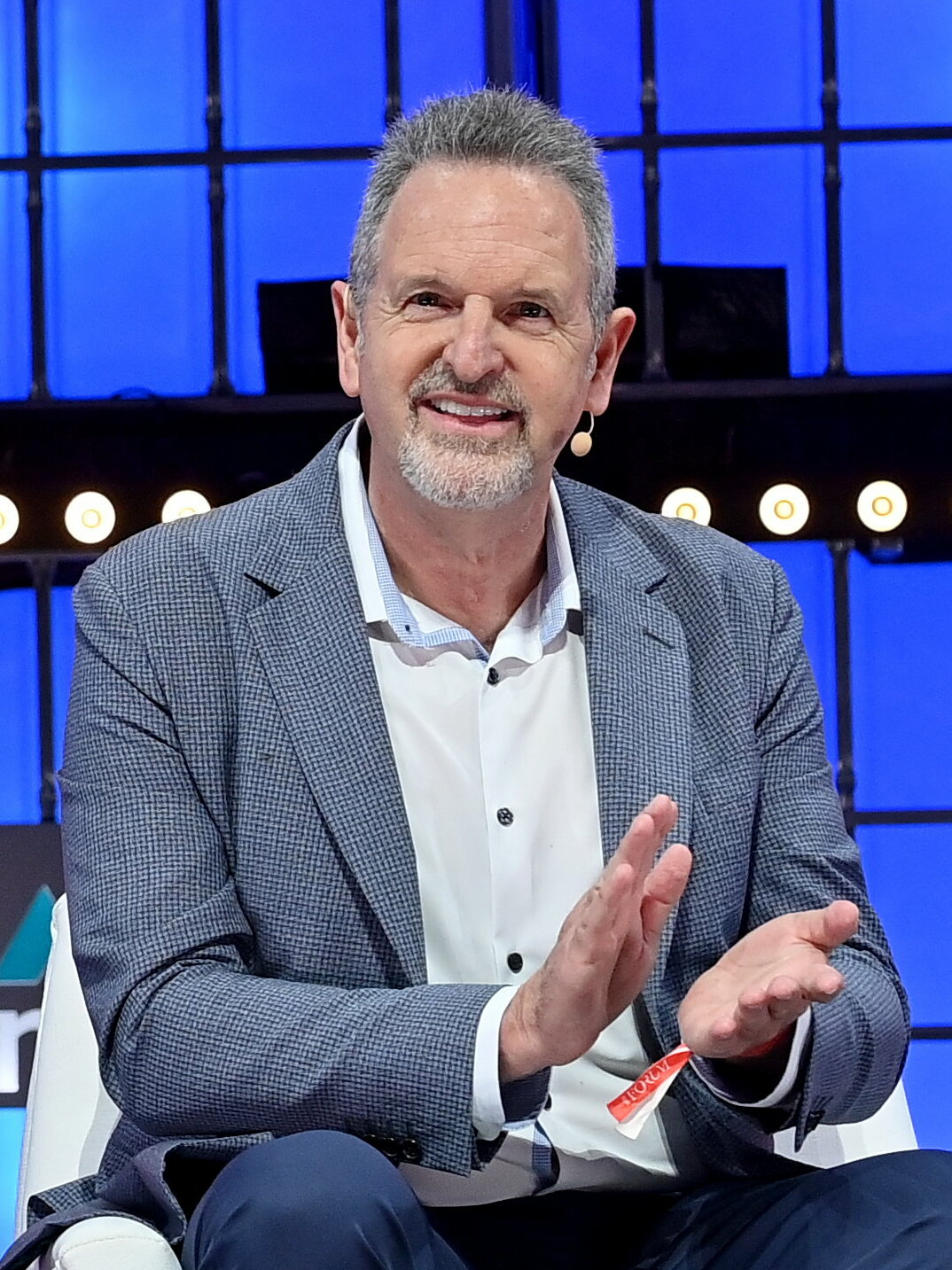
Haas in 2022

Haas moved to Silicon Valley to work in sales in the semiconductor industry after brief stints as an engineer at Texas Instruments, Xerox and NEC.

He led the sales division of Tensilica for five years beginning in 1999, then in 2004–2006 he was vice president of sales and marketing at Scintera Networks. He was a non-executive director of Mythic, an artificial intelligence company in the San Francisco Bay Area, and also as a director of Computacenter in the UK.

Haas worked for Nvidia for seven years, rising to vice president and general manager of its computing products business.

He joined Arm in 2013, rising to president of the Arm IP Products Group (IPG) in 2017. In February 2022, Haas succeeded Simon Segars as chief executive. Haas reformed his leadership team within a few weeks, letting three executives go. In addition, Haas was responsible for taking Arm from a privately held company to its second initial public offering.

In December 2024, it was announced that Haas will join the board of AstraZeneca as a non-executive director from January 2025. He is a member of The Business Council.

In 2025, Haas was named as one of the '100 Most Influential People in AI' by Time Magazine.

Haas also is chief executive for the international business of SoftBank, the majority owner of Arm. In 2026 Arm’s remuneration committee proposed to shareholders that Haas be awarded share options of up to $100 million if Arm becomes a trillion-dollar value company by 2029, and $800 million if Arm becomes a two trillion-dollar company by 2031.

== Personal life ==
Haas lives in Silicon Valley. He has two children.
