= Stuart Chambers (businessman) =

British businessman (born 1956)

- Born: Stuart John Chambers; May 1956 (age 70)
- Occupations: Chairman, Anglo American plc

Stuart John Chambers (born May 1956) is a British businessman. He has been the chairman of Anglo American plc since November 2017.

Until March 2021, Chambers was chairman of Travis Perkins, having joined the board as a non-executive director in 2017. He previously was chairman of ARM Holdings and Rexam until 2016; and in his non-executive career on the boards of Tesco, Manchester Airport Group, Smiths Group and Associated British Ports. His executive career included 13 years at Pilkington and its subsequent parent company Nippon Sheet Glass until 2010, in a number of executive roles and ultimately as chief executive of both companies. Prior to that, he had ten years of sales and marketing experience at Mars Corporation, following ten years at Shell plc as a chemical engineer.

Chambers is a member of The Takeover Panel and a visiting fellow at the Saïd Business School.
