= Dominique de Buman =

Swiss politician

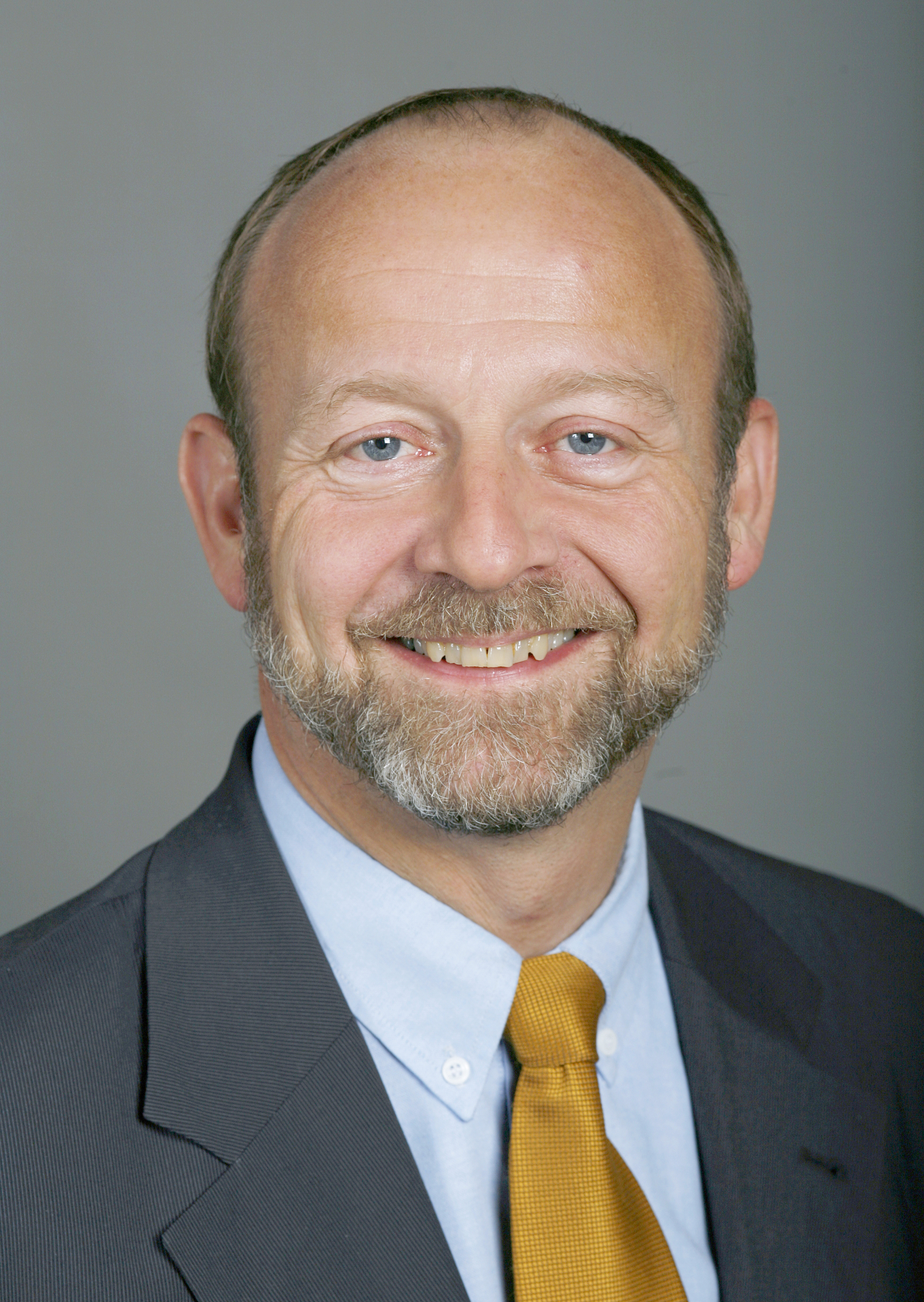

Member of the National Council of Switzerland
- In office 1 December 2003 – 1 December 2019

President of the National Council
- In office 27 November 2017 – 26 November 2018
- Preceded by: Jürg Stahl
- Succeeded by: Marina Carobbio Guscetti

Personal details
- Born: 28 April 1956 (age 69); Fribourg, Switzerland
- Political party: Christian Democratic People's Party

Dominique de Buman (born 28 April 1956) is a Swiss politician. He was a Vice President of the Christian Democratic People's Party between 2004 and 2016. In November 2017, he began a one-year term as President of the National Council, succeeding Jürg Stahl.

At the cantonal level, de Buman sat in the Grand Council (1986-2003). He was subsequently elected to the National Assembly as well as being elected as Vice President of the Christian Democratic People's Party on 18 September 2004. In the Federal Parliament, de Buman served on the Committee for Science, Education and Culture, the Committee for Economic Affairs and Taxation, and the Control Committee.

In 2007, de Buman was president of the organizing committee for the celebration of the 850th anniversary of the city of Fribourg. From 1994 to 2009 he presided over the Sparkasse his hometown.

From 1991 until 2004 de Buman was chief of staff of the pension fund of the city of Freiburg. Their poor leadership - the coverage reached only 32% - resulted in the formation of a commission of inquiry, which made de Buman partly responsible for the unfortunate situation.

He served as President of the National Council from 2017 to 2018. He did not run for re-election as the bylaws of the Fribourg Christian Democrats impose a four-term limit on its members.
