= Swiss National Science Foundation =

Science research support organisation

- Abbreviation: SNSF
- Founded: August 1, 1952; 74 years ago
- Founder: Swiss Confederation
- Legal status: private foundation
- Headquarters: Bern, Switzerland
- Foundation Council: Jürg Stahl (President)
- Research Council: Torsten Schwede (President)
- Directors of the administrative offices: Katrin Milzow and Thomas Werder Schläpfer
- Website: www.snf.ch

The Swiss National Science Foundation SNSF (German: Schweizerischer Nationalfonds zur Förderung der wissenschaftlichen Forschung, SNF; French: Fonds national suisse de la recherche scientifique, FNS; Italian: Fondo nazionale svizzero per la ricerca scientifica, Romansh: Fond naziunal svizzer per la perscrutaziun scientifica) is a research funding agency mandated by the Swiss Confederation.

In 2025, the SNSF invested the federal contributions of 1.2 billion Swiss francs in 2400 new research projects. The SNSF is financed by contributions from the federal government.

The SNSF funds research across all scientific disciplines on behalf of the federal government. To this end, it supports research projects, scientific careers, thematic research programmes and national and international research collaborations. The SNSF is the leading public research funding agency in Switzerland.

A Research Council comprising approximately 80 researchers is responsible for allocating funding through competitive scientific evaluation procedures.

== Organisation ==
The SNSF is a foundation governed by private law with a public funding mandate. The SNSF comprises the Foundation Council, the Research Council, the Delegates Assembly and the Administrative Offices. The offices are led by the executive management.

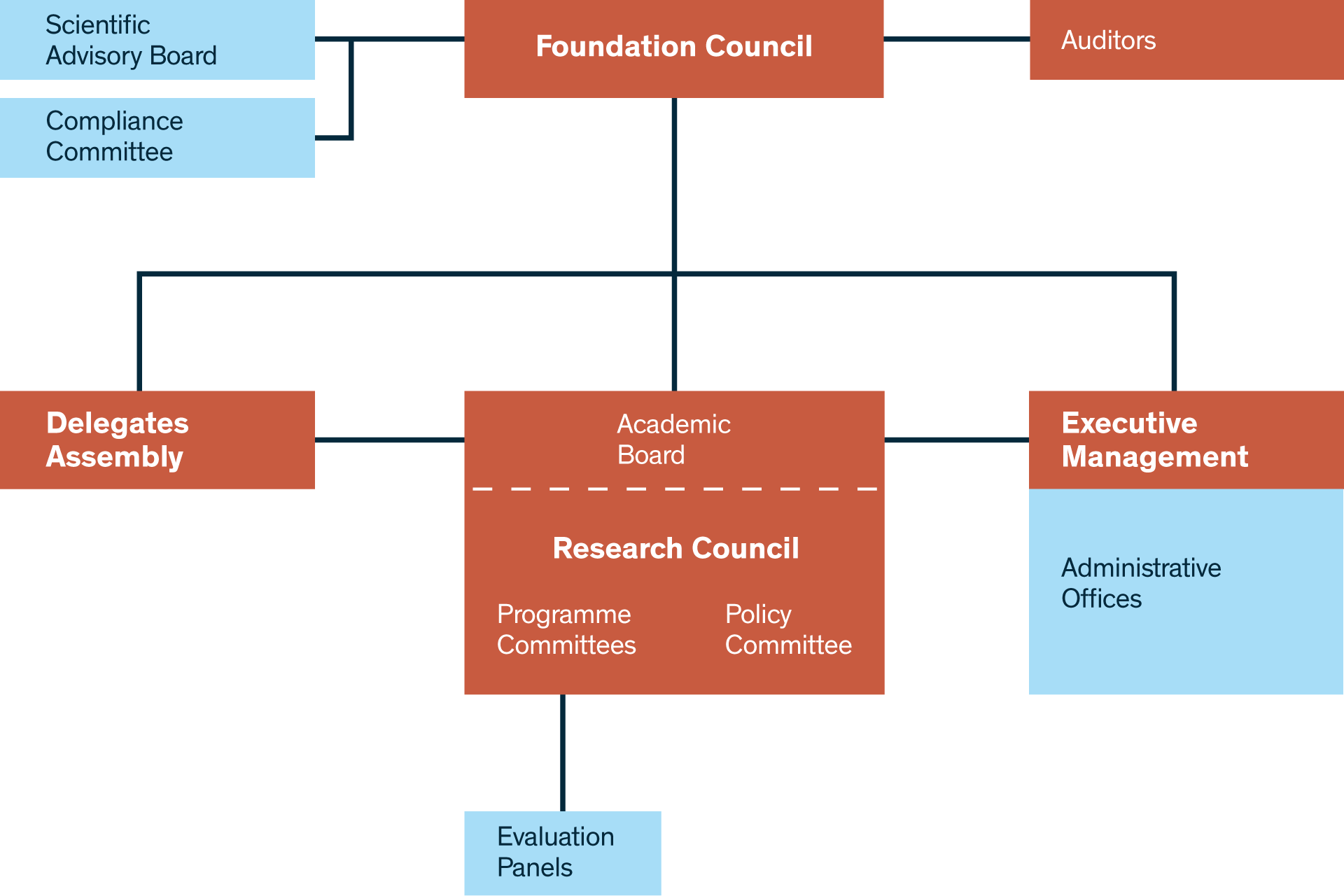
Organisational chart SNSF

=== Foundation Council ===
As the supreme governing body, the Foundation Council ensures that the Foundation’s purpose is upheld and makes decisions at a strategic level. It comprises representatives from Swiss higher education institutions, as well as the Swiss Academies of Arts and Sciences. The chair is elected by the Federal Council. Since 2020, the Foundation Council has been chaired by former National Councillor Jürg Stahl.

==== Presidents of the Foundation Council ====
- Since 2020: Jürg Stahl
- 2018–2019: Felicitas Pauss (interim)
- 2012–2018: Gabriele Gendotti
- 2008–2011: Hans Ulrich Stöckling
- 1999–2007: Fritz Schiesser
- 1995–1998: Ralf Hütter
- 1991–1994: Jean Cavadini
- 1987–1990: Alfred Schmid
- 1983–1986: Jean-François Poudret

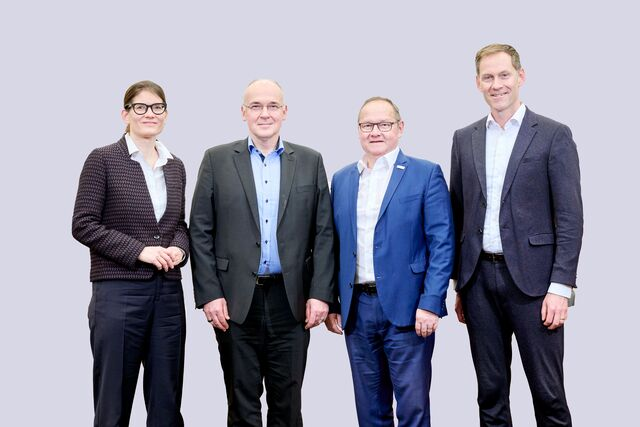
Members of the SNSF Board: Katrin Milzow (Co‑Director), Torsten Schwede (President of the Research Council), Jürg Stahl (President of the Foundation Council), and Thomas Werder Schläpfer (Co‑Director)

=== Research Council ===
The National Research Council comprises between 30 to 80 members, the majority of whom are based at Swiss higher education institutions. It assesses proposals submitted to the SNSF and makes funding decisions. The Research Council is supported by numerous evaluation panels comprising around 1,000 members. The Research Council is also responsible for shaping funding policy.

Torsten Schwede, a bioinformatician at the University of Basel, has chaired the Research Council since 2025. The Research Council is divided into six different committees:

- Policy Committee
- Programme Committee Projects
- Programme Committee Careers
- Programme Committee International Cooperation
- Programme Committee Long-term Research and Infrastructures
- Programme Committee Thematic and Solution-oriented Research

Presidents of the Research Council

- Since 2025: Torsten Schwede
- 2017–2024: Matthias Egger
- 2013–2016: Martin Vetterli
- 2005–2012: Dieter Imboden
- 1997–2004: Heidi Diggelmann

=== Delegates Assembly ===
The Delegates Assembly was established as a new body in 2024. It represents the interests of researchers and various organisations within the scientific community. It comprises 40 representatives from higher education institutions and other research institutions, the Swiss Academies of Arts and Sciences, and organisations for early-career researchers.

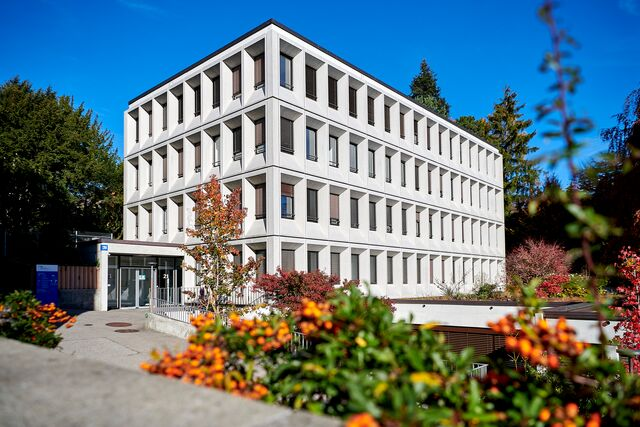
Administrative building of the SNSF in Bern

=== Administrative Offices ===
The administrative offices support and coordinate the activities of the Foundation Council, the Research Council and the Delegates Assembly. The offices organise the evaluation procedures for funding applications and are responsible for all administrative tasks as well as for the SNSF’s national and international networking and communication.

== Research Funding ==
=== Project and career funding ===
The majority of the SNSF’s budget goes towards project funding. The SNSF supports researchers to bring their scientific project to fruition.

In addition to project funding, the SNSF also supports scientific careers through various funding schemes that provide researchers with a salary or grant to support their work. These schemes enable researchers to carry out a project independently and, in some cases, to lead a team of researchers in Switzerland.

==== Postdoc.Mobility ====
The SNF Postdoc.Mobility fellowship is a competitive funding scheme for postdoctoral researchers seeking to undertake a research stay abroad. It is often regarded in academia as the Swiss equivalent of the European Marie Skłodowska-Curie Actions (MSCA). The fellowship is highly selective, with applications assessed on factors including academic excellence, the originality of the proposed research, and the extent to which the planned research stay abroad represents a significant step in the applicant's career. Following Switzerland's temporary exclusion from parts of the EU's Horizon Europe research programme, Postdoc.Mobility has also gained importance as a national alternative to MSCA Postdoctoral Fellowships, further increasing competition among early-career researchers in Switzerland.

=== Research programmes ===
Another key focus is funding through specific programmes. For these, the SNSF sets the thematic or organisational framework, in contrast to its project and career funding schemes that support researcher-driven projects.

The Federal Council launches the National Research Programmes (NRP) and the National Centres of Competence in Research (NCCRs) and mandates the SNSF to implement them.

==== National Research Programmes (NRP) ====
National Research Programmes (NRPs) make scientific contributions towards solving current challenges of national importance. Within an NRP, research projects are coordinated with a view to achieving a common goal. To maximise impact, collaboration and exchange with practice-based stakeholders are given high priority. NRPs last up to five years and are funded with between 10 and 20 million Swiss francs. Between 1975 and 2026, the federal government has launched 87 NRPs.

Proposals for NRPs may be submitted by various stakeholders. The State Secretariat for Education, Research and Innovation (SERI) compiles these proposals, consults the federal offices and submits recommendations to the Federal Council. The SNSF assesses the proposals on behalf of SERI to determine their scientific and organisational feasibility and develops the programme concepts. On this basis, the Federal Council decides whether to launch the programmes.

==== National Centres of Competence in Research (NCCRs) ====
National Centres of Competence in Research (NCCRs) serve to maintain and sustainably strengthen Switzerland’s position as a centre of research in fields that are crucial for the future of science, the economy and society. This is achieved by funding excellent research and building additional teaching and research capacity. NCCRs are based at one or more higher education institutions and consist of a centre of excellence as well as a national and international network. A National Centre of Competence in Research is supported for a period of ten to twelve years with funding of between 20 and 60 million Swiss francs from the SNSF, as well as additional funds from the higher education institutions’ own resources and third-party funding.

=== Other funding schemes ===
The SNSF funds science communication projects through the Agora funding scheme as well as supplementary measures through which the SNSF supports, for example, the advancement of female researchers or the reconciliation of family life and research work. In addition, the SNSF is involved in international cooperation with organisations and research programmes and also funds scientific conferences.

=== Open access ===
The SNSF funds the publication of academic works (primarily doctoral theses and postdoctoral theses). Since 2023, the SNSF has required that all scientific articles that it funds be made immediately accessible (open access) and use a free Creative Commons license that requires attribution. The rationale is as follows: “Scientific articles are primarily distributed and read digitally. Both researchers and the SNSF have an interest in ensuring that knowledge is disseminated as widely as possible and used in as many different ways as possible.”

=== Equality, diversity and inclusion ===
The SNSF is taking various measures to promote women and other under-represented groups in research: In 2024, it adopted the ‘Equality, Diversity and Inclusion’ (EDI vision) to this end. In this vision, the SNSF commits itself to addressing the issues of equality, diversity and inclusion across all funding schemes. This is achieved, on the one hand, by giving special consideration to these issues in the selection processes; on the other hand, it offers funding schemes and supplementary measures designed to provide targeted support for the careers of under-represented groups in research.

Even before the EDI vision was adopted, there were various schemes and programmes in place to support women and promote equality: These include the PRIMA (Promote Women in Academia) programme, which was transferred to other career programmes in 2021; this budget continues to be earmarked exclusively for women.

In addition, from 2020 until its dissolution in 2025, the SNSF was responsible for the AcademiaNet database of outstanding female researchers, with the aim of increasing the proportion of women in senior academic positions.

== Scientific awards and image competition ==
The SNSF awards four scientific prizes or is involved in their awarding: the Marie Heim-Vögtlin Prize recognises early-career female researchers for outstanding achievements. The Optimus Agora Prize honours innovative projects in science communication. In addition, the SNSF selects the winners of the Marcel Benoist Swiss Science Prize on behalf of the Marcel Benoist Foundation. The Latsis Prize is awarded annually by the SNSF on behalf of the Latsis Foundation to young researchers under the age of 40.

In addition to the science prizes, the SNSF also organises an annual image competition. Prizes are awarded to images that showcase the work of researchers in an aesthetic and apt manner.

== Horizons magazine ==
Horizons
- Native name: (in German) Horizonte (in French) Horizons
- Categories: Science magazine
- Frequency: Four times a year
- Publisher: Swiss National Science Foundation and Swiss Academies of Arts and Sciences
- Unpaid circulation: 29,800 in German; 13,600 in French
- Country: Switzerland
- Language: German, French and English
- Website: www.horizons-mag.ch

The research magazine Horizons has been published since 1988 published jointly by the Swiss National Science Foundation and the Swiss Academies of Arts and Sciences. Its independent editorial team reports presents the latest findings and new knowledge in all scientific disciplines: from biology and medicine, through social and cultural sciences, to mathematics and the natural sciences. It also discusses research policy issues of international significance.

Print copies are available free of charge by subscription and is also freely accessible in digital form. Horizons is published four times a year in French (Horizons) and German (Horizonte), subscription is free and the magazine is also available in English online.

== History ==
=== The origins of the Swiss National Science Foundation (1930–1952) ===
At the beginning of the 20th century, apart from ETH Zurich and a few professional associations, there was no national institution for scientific research in Switzerland. It was not until the 1930s that the Swiss federal government sought to play a greater role in the organisation of scientific research. To this end, it invested taxpayer funds in research through a job creation programme. Otto Zipfel, the Federal Council’s delegate for job creation, made the first attempt in 1941 to establish a national funding foundation for scientific and technical research, but failed due to federalist structures.

After World War II and the resumption of exchanges with the international research community, many Swiss researchers and industrialists felt that the neighbouring countries that had been at war were far ahead in terms of scientific and technological development. Calls for a national organisation and funding of research in order to catch up and support Europe’s reconstruction grew increasingly loud.

Alexander von Muralt, a professor of physiology at the University of Bern, was particularly committed to promoting research in Switzerland. In 1948, von Muralt formed a commission to which he invited not only representatives of Swiss universities but also the umbrella organisations, including the Swiss Society for Humanities (now SAGW), the Academy of Medical Sciences, and the Swiss Society of Natural Sciences (now SCNAT), of which he himself was president. In 1951, the commission submitted a memorandum to the Federal Council proposing the establishment of a "Swiss National Science Foundation for the Promotion of Scientific Research". It called for the creation of two bodies – a National Research Council and a Foundation Council – and federal funding of 4 million Swiss francs per year.

The Federal Council subsequently drafted a recommendation that was approved by Parliament in March 1952 without opposition. On 1 August 1952, the SNSF was founded in the presence of two Federal Councillors. Alexander von Muralt became the first president of the Research Council.

=== New structures for new tasks (1960–1975) ===
In the 1960s, the scientific and research landscape in Switzerland became increasingly institutionalised, and the SNSF underwent restructuring. The National Research Council of the SNSF – responsible for allocating research grants – was subdivided into three divisions: Division I for the social sciences and humanities, Division II for mathematics, natural and engineering sciences, and Division III for medicine and biology.

In response to the crises of the early 1970s (the oil price shock and the economic crisis), the Federal Council tasked the SNSF with implementing National Research Programmes (NRPs). These programmes were intended to provide scientifically sound solutions to current issues of societal importance. This led to the creation of the National Research Council’s fourth division in 1974.

=== Internationalisation and expansion of research funding (1995–2023) ===
In 1995, the SNSF, together with the State Secretariat for Education, Research and Innovation and Innosuisse, opened the Swiss Contact Office for Research and Higher Education (SwissCore) in Brussels, with the aim of connecting the Swiss and European research communities.

In 1996, Heidi Diggelmann, a physician, became the first woman to be elected president of the Research Council.

In 2001, National Centres of Competence in Research were introduced. They were intended to promote the structuring of the Swiss research landscape and to strengthen national collaboration among researchers, as well as to advance gender equality and to support early-career researchers.

Following Switzerland’s exclusion from the Horizon Europe Research Framework Programme in 2021, the SNSF launched a package of transitional measures on behalf of the federal government to promote the attractiveness and networking capabilities of Switzerland as a research hub. The transitional measures corresponded as closely as possible to the European calls for proposals but could not fully replace them. Since 1 January 2025, Switzerland has been fully associated with Horizon Europe – as well as with the Euratom Programme and the Digital Europe Programme. The SNSF consequently terminated the transitional measures at the end of 2024.

=== Present (2023–) ===
On 16 June 2023, the Federal Council approved the revised statutes of the SNSF, as amended by the Foundation Council. This reform laid out a new structure for the SNSF’s governing bodies. With this reorganisation, the SNSF responded to changing conditions in the research and higher education landscape and new demands on funding policy, particularly the sharp rise in the number of funding applications.

In the SNSF’s revised organisational structure, the Research Council has greater authority in determining funding policy and programmes. The Foundation Council was reduced from 42 members to between seven and 11 members. A new body – the Delegates Assembly – serves to represent the interests of Swiss higher education institutions and researchers. The new statutes came into force on 1 January 2024.

In early 2025, the Federal Council announced that, as part of relief package 27, it intended to cut the SNSF’s funding by 10 percent in 2027 and by 11 percent in 2028. The SNSF and other organisations in the research and academic community criticised these austerity measures in a press release.

In September 2025, the SNSF announced that, in response to the planned cuts, it would introduce various cost-saving measures as early as 2026, including the discontinuation and suspension of certain funding schemes and a reduction in the number of approved funding applications. In March 2026, the Swiss Parliament decided to cut the SNSF’s budget by five percent, rather than the planned 11 percent.

== Criticism ==
In a 2022 evaluation report, the Swiss Science Council (SSC) noted that the SNSF – despite its crucial contributions to the Swiss research landscape – ran the risk of spreading itself too thin and losing sight of its core tasks, which the SNSF itself acknowledged in its self-evaluation report. The SSC therefore recommended that the SNSF refrain from further expanding its remit and responsibilities and from strengthening its systemic influence.

In 2023, Sacha Zala, President of the Swiss Historical Society, criticised the way in which the SNSF allocates its funds, arguing that the norm that set the standard for what constituted good research was not defined by the humanities, but by the natural sciences. He would like to see adjustments tailored to the specific needs of the various disciplines, for example more funding for long-term projects in the humanities. Angelika Kalt, the Director of the SNSF at the time, rebutted his criticism. She did acknowledge the need for more involvement of stakeholders and referenced organisational reforms that were already under way.

== See also ==
- Swiss Science Prize Latsis
- List of universities in Switzerland
- Science and technology in Switzerland
- United States National Science Foundation
- Swiss Academies of Arts and Sciences
