= Simon Segars =

British businessman (born 1967)

Simon Segars FRS
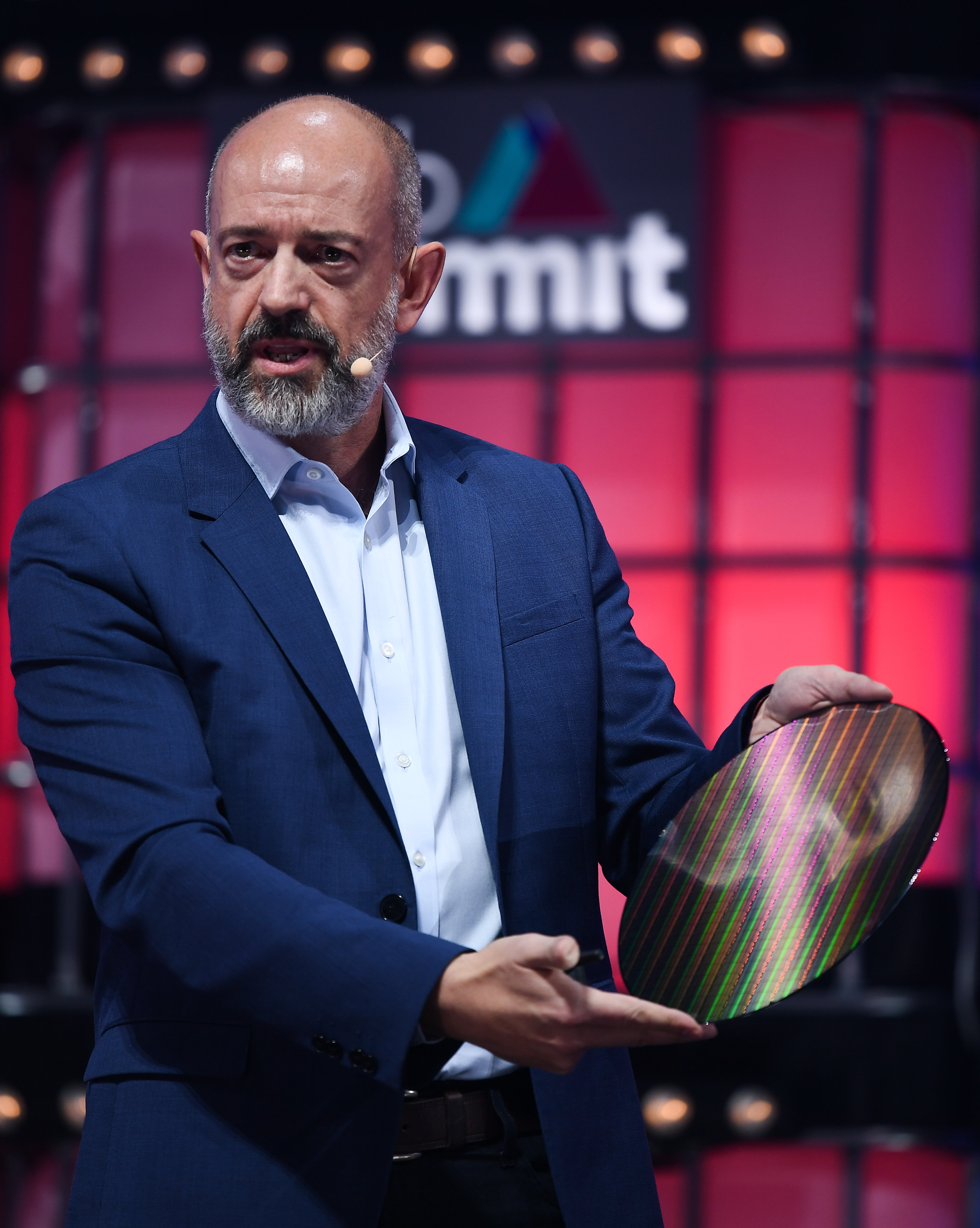
- Segars in 2021
- Born: Simon Anthony Segars; 17 October 1967 (age 58); Basildon, Essex, England
- Education: University of Sussex (BEng); University of Manchester (MSc)
- Known for: CEO of ARM Holdings (2013–2022)
- Awards: UKtech50 (2016)
- Scientific career
- Fields: CPU design; ARM architecture; Embedded systems; mbed; Electronic design automation
- Workplaces: Standard Telephones and Cables; Dolby Laboratories; Plastic Logic; ARM Holdings plc
- Thesis: Low power microprocessor design (1996)
- Academic advisors: Steve Furber

Simon Anthony Segars FRS (born 17 October 1967) is a British business executive who was chief executive officer (CEO) of ARM Holdings plc from 2013 to 2022. ARM is the UK's largest semiconductor IP company headquartered in Cambridge, England, and was acquired by SoftBank Group for £24.3 billion in 2016.

== Education ==
Segars attended Woodlands School in Basildon, and was educated at the University of Sussex where he earned a bachelor of engineering degree in electronic engineering. He went on to study for a master's degree from the School of Computer Science at the University of Manchester in 1996 on low power microprocessor design in the ARM6 chip, supervised by Steve Furber.

== Career ==
After working for Standard Telephones and Cables, Segars joined ARM in 1991 as its 16th employee. He led development of the ARM7TM and ARM9TM Thumb processor families.

In July 2013 he succeeded Warren East as CEO of ARM. He is a member of the board of directors at Electronic Design Automation Ltd, the EDA Consortium, the Global Semiconductor Alliance and Dolby Laboratories Inc. He is Chair of Silicon Quantum Computing.

In February 2022, Rene Haas succeeded Segars as CEO, with Segars leaving Arm.

== Awards and honours ==
In 2016, Segars was named the UKtech50 most influential person in UK Information technology by Computer Weekly. He was elected a Fellow of the Royal Society (FRS) in 2024.

== Personal life ==
Segars is married, with three children.
