= Max Planck Institute for Marine Microbiology =

Research institute in Bremen, Germany

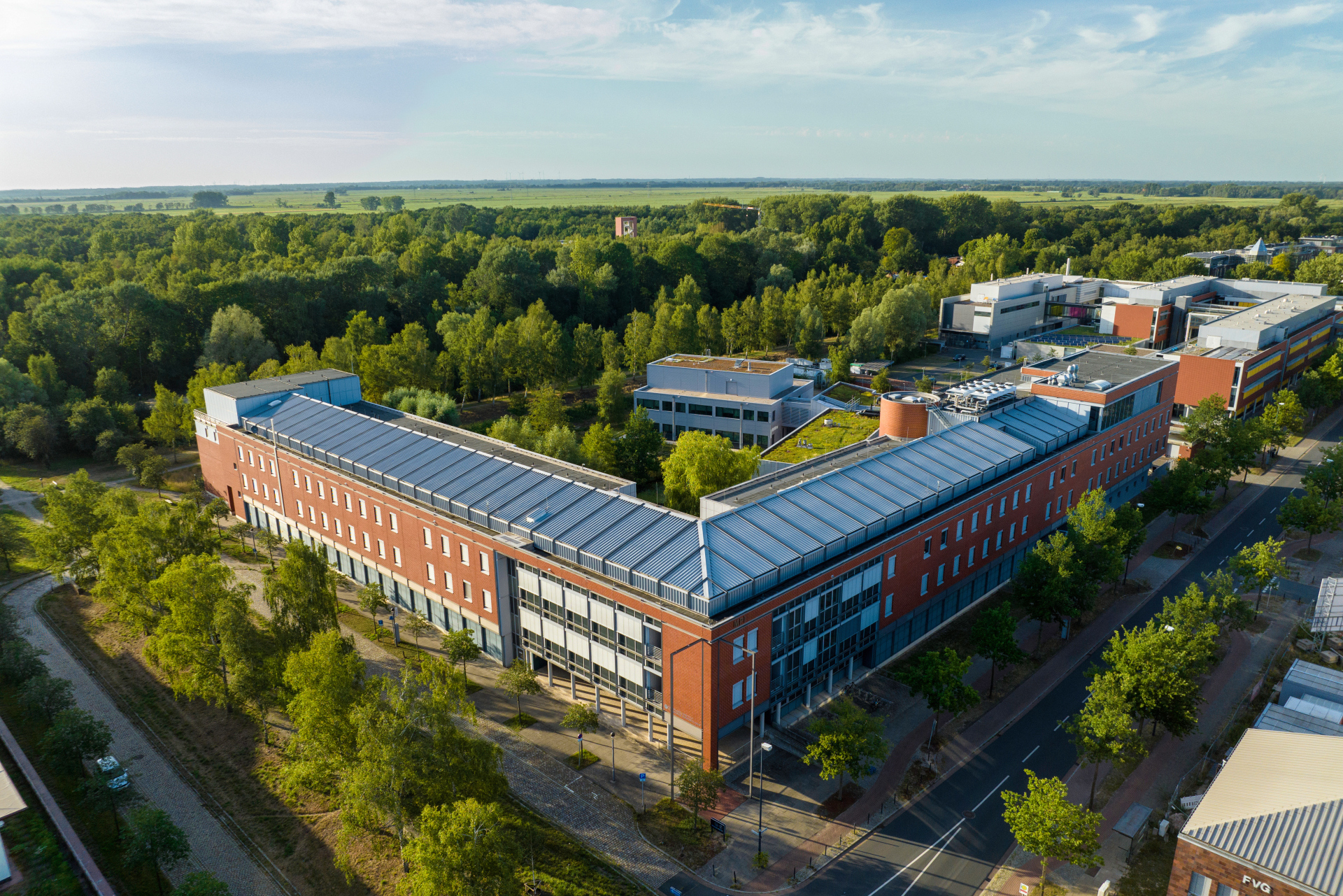
Building of the Max Planck Institute for Marine Microbiology in Bremen, Germany.

The Max Planck Institute for Marine Microbiology (MPI-MM) in Bremen was founded in 1992 (34 years ago). The institute belongs to the Biological-Medical Section of the Max Planck Society. The main focus of research at the MPI-MM is the diversity and function of marine microorganisms and their interactions with the environment.

Researchers at the MPI-MM use modern methods to study bacteria, archaea, viruses and other microorganisms in the ocean, along coastlines, in the open sea, and in the deep sea. They play a key role in the oceans, the climate and the living conditions on Earth.

The MPI-MM conducts research in close cooperation with research institutions in northern Germany and around the world. Its researchers regularly take part in international expeditions to various marine regions.

The founding directors of the MPI-MM are Friedrich Widdel and Bo Barker Jørgensen, both now emeriti. The current directors are Rudolf Amann, Nicole Dubilier, and Marcel Kuypers. In 2026, Tatiana Ilyina and Jean-Baptiste Raina will also be appointed as directors. Rudolf Amann will continue to serve as Managing Director until 2028.

== Organization and structure ==
The institute is currently divided into three departments and several research groups.

=== Department of Biogeochemistry (Marcel Kuypers) ===
The Department of Biogeochemistry studies biogeochemical material cycles, particularly the turnover of carbon, nitrogen, and sulfur compounds in the water column and in sediments.

- AG Biogeochemistry
- Microbial Physiology Research Group (Boran Kartal)
- Greenhouse Gases Research Group (Jana Milucka)

=== Department of Molecular Ecology (Rudolf Amann) ===
The Department of Molecular Ecology investigates the diversity, structure, and dynamics of microbial communities in marine habitats using molecular biology and genomic methods.

- Molecular Ecology Core Group
- Flow Cytometry Research Group (Bernhard Fuchs)
- ERC Group for Ecological Genomics (Luis Humberto Orellana Retamal)
- Max Planck Research Group Protist Virology (Matthias Fischer)

=== Department of Symbiosis (Nicole Dubilier) ===
The Department of Symbiosis studies symbiotic communities between microorganisms and hosts such as tubeworms or mussels in coastal and deep-sea habitats.

- Symbiosis Core Group
- Metabolic Interactions Research Group (Manuel Liebeke)
- Marine Transmissible Cancers Research Group (Alicia L Bruzos)
- Emmy Noether Research Group for Organosulfur Cycling (Eileen Kröber)

=== Other research groups ===
- HGF-MPG Joint Research Group for Deep-Sea Ecology and Technology (Antje Boetius) in cooperation with the Alfred Wegener Institute (AWI) in Bremerhaven
- HIFMB-MPG Bridging Group Marine -Omics (Murat Eren) in cooperation with The Helmholtz Institute for Functional Marine Biodiversity (HIFMB) in Oldenburg
- Microsensor Group (Dirk de Beer)

== Research Infrastructure ==
At the Max Planck Institute for Marine Microbiology, there are in-house workshops that develop and manufacture new research instruments in coordination with scientists and engineers, both for the institute and for fieldwork. In addition, the MPI-MM has numerous major instruments in its laboratories, including a nanoscale secondary ion mass spectrometer (NanoSIMS), a MALDI-imaging mass spectrometer, and several modern microscopes.

== Teaching ==
Researchers at the Max Planck Institute for Marine Microbiology participate in teaching, primarily at the University of Bremen, especially in the Departments of Biology/Chemistry, and Earth Sciences. Directors Rudolf Amann, Nicole Dubilier, Marcel Kuypers, and group leader Antje Boetius also hold professorships at the University of Bremen. In addition, some researchers are active as private lecturers.

=== International Max Planck Research School (IMPRS) ===
Founded in 2002, the International Max Planck Research School of Marine Microbiology (IMPRS Marmic) offers a structured graduate program providing German and international Master's and PhD students with high-quality, fast, and structured training. In addition to the MPI-MM, the University of Bremen, Constructor University and the Alfred Wegener Institute are also involved in IMPRS.

== Spin-Offs ==
In 2005, the company Ribocon GmbH was founded. The company's goal is to transfer knowledge and technologies from science into industry. Its portfolio currently includes sequencing and genome analysis, phylogenetic reconstruction, probe/primer design, as well as support with hardware and software issues using ARB and SILVA. In 2017, a team of marine researchers from the Max Planck Institute in Bremen founded the company HyperSurvey (today PlanBlue), which provides technology for rapid and cost-efficient monitoring of marine habitats, such as coral reefs.
