= Single-atom transistor =

Electronic device

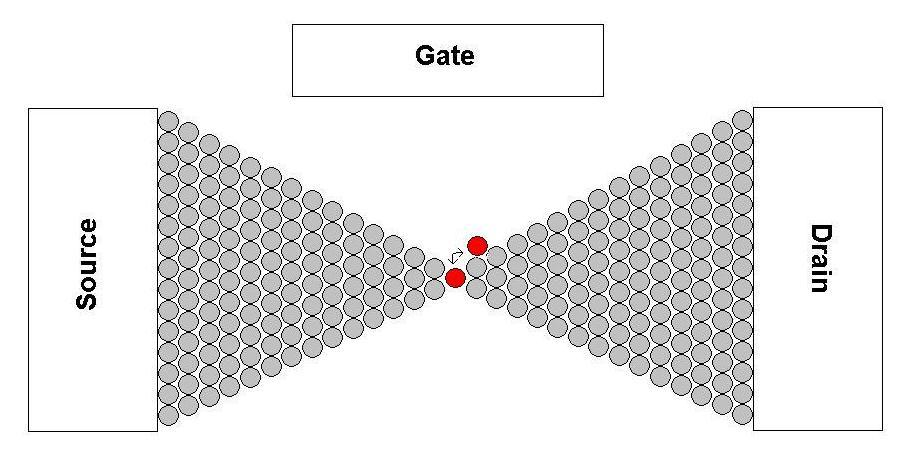
This image shows the structure of an atomic transistor

A single-atom transistor is a device that can open and close an electrical circuit by the controlled and reversible repositioning of one single atom. The single-atom transistor was invented and first demonstrated in 2002 by Dr. Fangqing Xie in Prof. Thomas Schimmel's Group at the Karlsruhe Institute of Technology (former University of Karlsruhe). By means of a small electrical voltage applied to a control electrode, the so-called gate electrode, a single silver atom is reversibly moved in and out of a tiny junction, in this way closing and opening an electrical contact.

Therefore, the single-atom transistor works as an atomic switch or atomic relay, where the switchable atom opens and closes the gap between two tiny electrodes called source and drain. The single-atom transistor opens perspectives for the development of future atomic-scale logics and quantum electronics.

At the same time, the device of the Karlsruhe team of researchers marks the lower limit of miniaturization, as feature sizes smaller than one atom cannot be produced lithographically. The device represents a quantum transistor, the conductance of the source-drain channel being defined by the rules of quantum mechanics. It can be operated at room temperature and at ambient conditions, i.e. neither cooling nor vacuum are required.

Few atom transistors have been developed at Waseda University and at Italian CNR by Takahiro Shinada and Enrico Prati, who observed the Anderson–Mott transition in miniature by employing arrays of only two, four and six individually implanted As or P atoms.

== See also ==
- QFET (quantum field-effect transistor)
