= Felicitas Pauss =

Austrian physicist

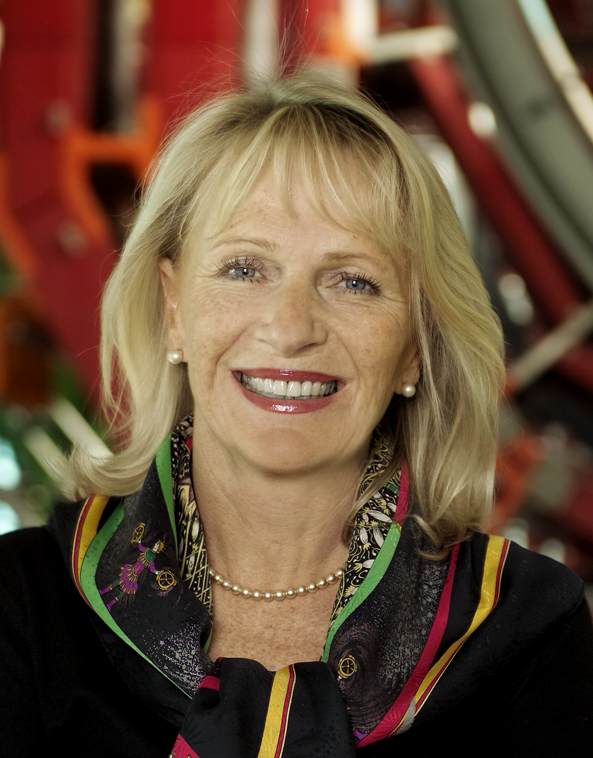
- Felicitas Pauss (2004)
- Born: 26 March 1951 (age 74); Vorau
- Education: University of Graz
- Alma mater: University of Graz (Ph.D. 1976)
- Known for: High energy particle physics, astroparticle physics
- Awards: Cross of Honour for Science and Art, First Class (2009); Erna Hamburger Prize (2012); Doctor Honoris Causa, TU Wien (2014); Richard E. Ernst Gold Medal (2017)
- Scientific career
- Fields: Particle and astroparticle physics
- Institutions: Max Planck Institute, Cornell University, CERN, Swiss Federal Institute of Technology Zurich

Felicitas Pauss (born 26 March 1951 in Vorau, Austria) is an Austrian physicist. She was elected Professor for Experimental Particle physics at ETH Zurich, Switzerland, in 1993. Her research activities concentrated on two main research fields: particle physics at the high-energy frontier and astroparticle physics, addressing fundamental open questions about the structure of the Universe and the underlying mechanisms that govern its evolution.

== Career ==
Felicitas Pauss obtained her PhD in theoretical physics and mathematics at the University of Graz (Austria) in 1976. Subsequently she took up a position at the Max Planck Institute in Munich (Germany), where she moved to the field of experimental particle physics. She continued her research at Cornell University (USA) and CERN (Geneva, Switzerland) before being elected professor at ETH Zurich in 1993, where she directed the Institute for Particle Physics from 1997 till 2007. From January 2009 till March 2013 she was in charge of CERN’s International Relations. In April 2013, she resumed her activities at ETH and took up the function of adviser to the ETH president on international affairs. In June 2013, she was elected president of the Lecturers’ Conference of ETH Zurich, a position she held until retirement. From 2014 till 2019 she was first vice-president and then president a.i. of the Foundation Council of the Swiss National Science Foundation.

Felicitas Pauss has been member of the Compact Muon Solenoid (CMS) collaboration at CERN’s Large Hadron Collider (LHC) since the early 1990’s and fulfilled important management duties in CMS, one of the two large experiments at the LHC. She has strongly contributed to the design and construction of the CMS experiment, focusing on all aspects of the crystal calorimeter. After having participated in the discovery of the W and Z Bosons in 1983 (UA1 Collaboration, Nobel Prize in physics in 1984 to Carlo Rubbia, spokesperson of UA1), another highlight in her career was the discovery of the Higgs Boson with CMS in 2012. This discovery was recognised as important experimental input for the 2013 Nobel Prize in physics (François Englert and Peter Higgs).

In 2003, Felicitas Pauss started a new field of research at ETH Zurich: the detection of very high-energy gamma rays from galactic and extragalactic sources with the Cherenkov telescope MAGIC (in La Palma, Spain). In addition, her group successfully designed, constructed and operated a novel camera concept based on Silicon Photomultipliers (SiPMs) with associated readout electronics in 2011 (FACT). This success had an important impact on the design of future telescopes for the Cherenkov Telescope Array (CTA), the next generation of very high-energy gamma-ray observatories.

By September 2024, Felicitas Pauss has published about 1’900 scientific papers (INSPIRES-HEP), resulting in more than 230’000 citations (h-index = 208); she is co-author of 37 renowned papers (more than 500 citation, with 5 papers more than 2’500 citations). Felicitas Pauss gave more than 470 talks at international conferences, colloquia and seminars as well as talks for government officials, funding agencies and the general public. Felicitas Pauss has served on numerous national and international scientific advisory boards as well as in international evaluation panels.

== Awards and honors ==
- 2003: ‘Grand Decoration of Honour’ of the Federal Province of Styria (AT)
- 2008: German Academy of Science Leopoldina, elected member (DE)
- 2009: ‘Cross of Honour for Science and Art, First Class’ of the Republic of Austria
- 2012: Erna Hamburger Prize of the EPFL-WISH foundation (CH)
- 2013: Elected Member of the Executive Board of the Swiss Academy of Sciences (SCNAT)
- 2013: European Physical Society's High Energy and Particle Physics Prize awarded to the ATLAS and CMS collaborations
- 2014: Doctor Honoris Causa, Technical University Vienna (AT)
- 2014: Lise Meitner Lectures at the TU Berlin (DE) and TU Graz (AT), organized by the German and Austrian Physical Societies
- 2016: European Academy of Sciences and Arts, elected member (Salzburg, AT)
- 2017: Chaim Weizmann Lectureship, University of Fribourg (CH)
- 2017: Richard E. Ernst Gold Medal, ETH Zurich (CH)

== Publications (selection) ==
- Experimental Observation of Lepton Pairs of Invariant Mass Around 95 GeV/c**2 at the CERN SPS Collider, UA1 Collaboration, Phys.Lett.B 126 (1983) 398-410 (INSPIRE)
- Search for the standard model Higgs boson at LEP ALEPH, DELPHI, L3 and OPAL Collaborations at LEP, Phys.Lett.B 565 (2003) 61-75; e-Print: hep-ex/0306033
- Comparison between high-energy proton and charged pion induced damage in PbWO4 calorimeter crystals, P. Lecomte, D. Luckey, F. Nessi-Tedaldi, F. Pauss, D. Renker, Nuclear Instruments and Methods in Physics Research A 587 266–271 (2008); e-Print: 0709.4409
- The CMS electromagnetic calorimeter project : Technical Design Report, CMS Collaboration, CERN-LHCC-97-033, CMS-TDR-4
- The CMS Experiment at the CERN LHC, CMS Collaboration, JINST 3 (2008) S08004
- Observation of a New Boson at a Mass of 125 GeV with the CMS Experiment at the LHC, CMS Collaboration, Phys.Lett.B 716 (2012) 30-61; e-Print: 1207.7235
- Precise determination of the mass of the Higgs boson and tests of compatibility of its couplings with the standard model predictions using proton collisions at 7 and 8, TeV CMS Collaboration, Eur.Phys.J.C 75 (2015) 5, 212; e-Print: 1412.8662 [hep-ex]
- Design and operation of FACT – the first G-APD Cherenkov telescope, FACT Collaboration, Journal of Instrumentation, Volume 8, June 2013, e-Print: 1304.1710
- Observation of pulsed gamma-rays above 25 GeV from the Crab pulsar with MAGIC, MAGIC Collaboration, Science 322 1221 (2008); doi:10.1126/science.1164718
- Very-High-Energy Gamma Rays from a Distant Quasar: How Transparent Is the Universe?, MAGIC Collaboration, Science 320 1752 (2008); doi:10.1126/science.1157087, e-Print: 0807.2822
- First Result from the Alpha Magnetic Spectrometer on the International Space Station: Precision Measurement of the Positron Fraction in Primary Cosmic Rays of 0.5–350 GeV, AMS Collaboration, Phys.Rev.Lett. 110 (2013) 141102; doi:10.1103/PhysRevLett.110.141102
