= Arm Holdings =

British semiconductor and software design company

Arm Holdings plc

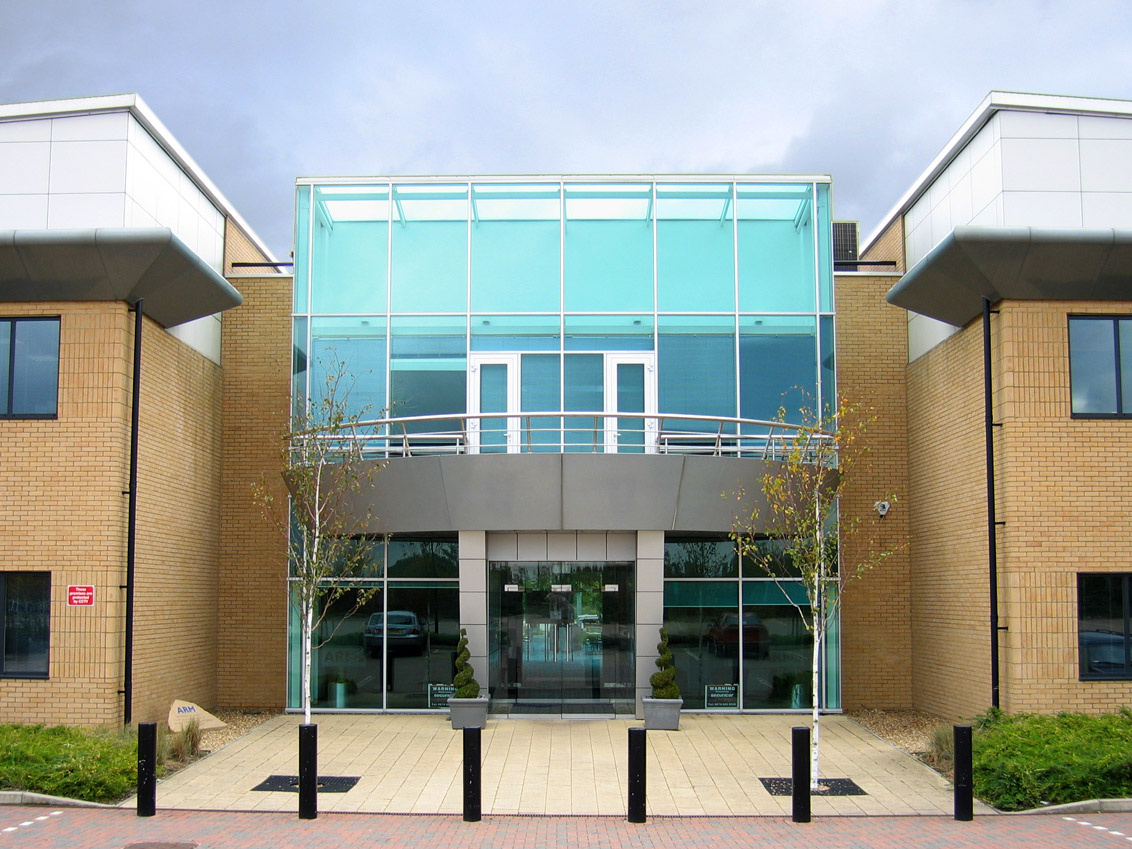
- Arm offices in Cambridge, England
- Formerly: Widelogic Limited (1990); Advanced RISC Machines Limited (1990–1998)
- Type: Public subsidiary
- Traded as: Nasdaq: ARM; Nasdaq-100 component; LSE: ARM (until 2016); FTSE 100 component (until 2016)
- Industry: Semiconductors
- Founded: 12 November 1990; 36 years ago
- Founders: Robin Saxby, Jamie Urquhart, Mike Muller, Tudor Brown, Lee Smith, John Biggs, Harry Oldham, Dave Howard, Pete Harrod, Harry Meekings, Al Thomas, Andy Merritt, David Seal
- Headquarters: Cambridge, England, UK
- Key people: Masayoshi Son (chairman); Rene Haas (CEO)
- Products: Microprocessor designs, graphics processing unit (GPU) designs and neural processing unit (NPU) designs
- Revenue: ▲US$4.92 billion (2026)
- Operating income: ▲US$900 million (2026)
- Net income: ▲US$904 million (2026)
- Total assets: ▲US$10.70 billion (2026)
- Total equity: ▲US$8.29 billion (2026)
- Number of employees: 9,584 (2026)
- Parent: SoftBank Group (86.4%)
- Website: arm.com
- Footnotes; Financials as of 31 March 2026.

Arm Holdings plc is a British semiconductor and software design company headquartered in Cambridge, whose primary business is the design of central processing unit (CPU) cores that implement the ARM architecture family of instruction sets. It also designs other chips, provides software development tools under the DS-5, RealView and Keil brands, and provides systems and platforms, system-on-chip (SoC) infrastructure and software. As a holding company, it also holds shares of other companies. Since 2016, it has been majority owned by Japanese conglomerate SoftBank Group.

"ARM" was originally an acronym for Acorn RISC Machine and later for Advanced RISC Machines. While ARM CPUs first appeared in the Acorn Archimedes, a desktop computer, today's systems include mostly embedded systems, including ARM CPUs used in virtually all modern smartphones, up to used in the fastest supercomputer. Processors based on designs licensed from Arm, or designed by licensees of one of the ARM instruction set architectures, are used in all classes of computing devices. Arm has two lines of graphics processing units (GPUs), Mali, and the newer Immortalis (which includes hardware-based ray-tracing).

Arm's main CPU competitors in servers include IBM, Intel and AMD. Intel competed with ARM-based chips in mobile devices but Arm no longer has any competition in that space (although vendors of actual ARM-based chips compete within that arena). Arm's main GPU competitors include mobile GPUs from technology companies Imagination Technologies (PowerVR), Qualcomm (Adreno), and increasingly Nvidia, AMD, Samsung and Intel. While competing in GPUs, Qualcomm, Samsung and Nvidia all have combined their GPUs with Arm-licensed CPUs.

Arm had a primary listing on the London Stock Exchange (LSE) and was a constituent of the FTSE 100 Index. It also had a secondary listing of American depositary receipts on New York's Nasdaq. However, Japanese multinational conglomerate SoftBank Group made an agreed offer for Arm on 18 July 2016, subject to approval by Arm's shareholders, valuing the company at £24.3 billion. The transaction was completed on 5 September 2016. A planned takeover deal by Nvidia, announced in 2020, collapsed in February 2022, with SoftBank subsequently deciding to pursue an initial public offering on the Nasdaq in 2023, valuing Arm at US$54.5 billion.

== History ==
=== Name ===
The acronym ARM was first used in 1983 and originally stood for "Acorn RISC Machine". Acorn Computers' first RISC processor was used in the original Acorn Archimedes and was one of the first RISC processors used in small computers. However, when the company was incorporated in 1990, what 'ARM' stood for changed to "Advanced RISC Machines". According to Steve Furber the name was changed at the behest of Apple, which did not wish to have the name of a competitor in the name of the company. At the time of the IPO in 1998, the company name was changed to "ARM Holdings", often just called ARM like the processors.

On 1 August 2017, the styling and logo were changed. The logo is now all lowercase ('arm') and other uses of the name are in sentence case ('Arm').

=== Founding ===
The company was founded on 12 November 1990 as Widelogic Limited but this was rapidly changed, on 3 December 1990, to Advanced RISC Machines Limited and structured as a joint venture between Acorn Computers, Apple, and VLSI Technology. Acorn provided 12 employees, VLSI provided tools, Apple provided a US$3 million investment (equivalent to $7 million in 2025). Larry Tesler, Apple VP was a key person and he helped recruit the first CEO at the joint venture, Robin Saxby. The new company intended to further the development of the Acorn RISC Machine processor, which was originally used in the Acorn Archimedes and had been selected by Apple for its Newton project. Its first profitable year was 1993. The company's Silicon Valley and Tokyo offices were opened in 1994. ARM invested in Palmchip Corporation in 1997 to provide system on chip platforms and to enter into the disk drive market. In 1998, the company changed its name from Advanced RISC Machines Ltd to ARM Ltd. The company was first listed on the London Stock Exchange (LSE) and Nasdaq in 1998 and by February 1999, Apple's shareholding had fallen to 14.8 per cent.

In 2010, ARM joined with IBM, Texas Instruments, Samsung, ST-Ericsson (since dissolved) and Freescale Semiconductor (now NXP Semiconductors) in forming a non-profit open source engineering company, Linaro.

=== Acquisitions and divestments ===
1999
Micrologic Solutions, a software consulting company based in Cambridge
2000
Allant Software, a developer of debugging software
Infinite Designs, a design company based in Sheffield
EuroMIPS, a smart card design house in Sophia Antipolis, France
2001
The engineering team of Noral Micrologics, a debug hardware and software company based in Blackburn, England
2003
Adelante Technologies of Belgium, creating its OptimoDE data engines business, a form of lightweight DSP engine
2004
Axys Design Automation, a developer of ESL design tools and Artisan Components, a designer of physical IP (intellectual property: standard cell libraries, memory compilers, PHYs etc.), the building blocks of integrated circuits
2005
KEIL Software, a leading developer of software development tools for the microcontroller (MCU) market, including 8051 and C16x platforms. ARM also acquired the engineering team of PowerEscape.
2006
Falanx (now called ARM Norway), a developer of 3D graphics accelerators
SOISIC, who specialise in developing silicon-on-insulator physical IP
2008
Logipard AB, a public Swedish company spun out of Anoto AB, specialising in graphics processors
2011
Obsidian Software Inc., a privately held company that creates processor verification products
Prolific, a developer of automated layout optimisation software tools
2013
Internet of Things startup Sensinode
Cadence's PANTA family of high-resolution display processor and scaling coprocessor IP cores (formerly developed in Evatronix)

2014
PolarSSL, a software library implementing the SSL and TLS protocols. (In February 2015, PolarSSL has been rebranded to mbed TLS to better show its fit inside the mbed ecosystem.)

Duolog Technologies, an electronic design automation company that developed a suite of tools that automate the process of IP configuration and IP integration

2015
Sansa Security, a provider of hardware security intellectual property (IP) and software for advanced system-on-chip components deployed in Internet of Things (IoT) and mobile devices

Wicentric, a Bluetooth Smart stack and profile provider
Sunrise Micro Devices, a provider of sub-one volt Bluetooth radio intellectual property (IP)
Offspark, a provider of IoT security software
Carbon Design Systems, a provider of cycle-accurate virtual prototyping solutions
On 19 November, ARM, alongside Cisco Systems, Dell, Intel, Microsoft, and Princeton University, founded the OpenFog Consortium, to promote interests and development in fog computing.
2016
Apical, a provider of imaging and embedded computer vision IP products
Allinea Software, a leading provider of software tools for HPC
2018
Treasure Data ($600 million acquisition), provides enterprise data management software for device-to-data IoT platform
Stream Technologies, provided connectivity management platform and GSM connectivity
2019
WigWag, an IoT gateway and cloud platform business
2020
In July 2020, Arm announced plans to spin off Treasure Data, together with the other parts of its "IoT Services Group" business, into separate SoftBank-owned entities by the end of September 2020.
2025
August: Cadence Design Systems completed the acquisition of Arm Artisan Foundation IP, which ARM originally acquired from Artisan Components in 2004.

=== Reported approach for Cerebras Systems ===
In May 2026, Bloomberg News reported that Arm Holdings and its majority owner, SoftBank Group, had made a preliminary approach to acquire the wafer-scale integrated circuit maker Cerebras Systems, in the weeks before Cerebras's planned initial public offering. According to the report, the approach was rebuffed.

=== Changes of ownership ===
Japanese conglomerate SoftBank Group made an agreed offer for ARM on 18 July 2016, subject to approval by ARM's shareholders, valuing the company at £23.4 billion (US$32 billion). The transaction was completed on 5 September 2016.

In 2017, a 25% stake of Arm was transferred to the SoftBank Vision Fund, which received investment from the Saudi sovereign fund.

=== Attempted acquisition by Nvidia and initial public offering ===
American technology company Nvidia announced plans on 13 September 2020 to acquire ARM from SoftBank, pending regulatory approval, for a value of US$40 billion in stock and cash, which would have been the largest semiconductor acquisition to that date. SoftBank Group would acquire slightly less than a 10% stake in Nvidia, and ARM would maintain its headquarters in Cambridge. There was opposition to the deal, including national security concerns from the UK and competition concerns from fellow tech companies such as Google, Microsoft and Qualcomm, whose chips in use or on sale heavily rely on Arm's intellectual property. It was also being battled by Arm China, its subsidiary, a majority stake of which was held by Chinese investors. The acquisition was initially scheduled to conclude before the end of 2022 per the contract. However, the European Commission, the UK Competition and Markets Authority and the US Federal Trade Commission raised completion concerns focusing on Arm's role within Nvidia, while the UK government also raised concerns about national security. The merger attempt was eventually cancelled in February 2022 due to the aforementioned regulatory pressure and hurdles.

Arm filed for an IPO on 21 August 2023 on the Nasdaq, rather than the LSE. A few days earlier, SoftBank Group bought back the 25% stake from Vision Fund for around $16 billion, valuing Arm at over $64 billion. Arm went public on 14 September 2023 raising $4.87 billion at a $54.5 billion valuation, with SoftBank continuing to own roughly 90% of the company following the offering.

=== Dispute over Arm China leadership ===
SoftBank Group sold more than half of Arm China in 2018 to a local consortium consisting of various parties including China Investment Corp. and the Silk Road Fund, effectively relinquishing majority ownership of its Chinese subsidiary to a group of investors with ties to the Chinese state. From 2020, discord between Arm and the effective owners of Arm China became visible after the British parent company unsuccessfully tried to oust the chief executive of the subsidiary, who, however, managed to retain his position. A prevailing view emerged that the matter would negatively affect the pending approval by the Chinese regulators of the SoftBank–Nvidia deal, as well as any public offering of Arm.

In September 2021, despite Arm's denial, reports stated that the chief executive of Arm China, whom the British parent had tried to dismiss, had publicly declared the "independence" of Arm China. In February 2022, Allen Wu, the CEO of Arm China, floated the idea of a public offering of the Chinese subsidiary in 2025.

On 29 April 2022, it was reported that the CEO and legal representative of Arm China had finally been replaced according to legally recognized filings. However, Allen Wu continued to dispute this. Subsequently, in 2023, key staff left to form their own chip design startup Borui Jingxin, which competes with Arm China, particularly for engineers.

== Operations ==
Unlike most traditional microprocessor suppliers, such as Intel, Freescale (the former semiconductor division of Motorola, now NXP Semiconductors) and Renesas (a former joint venture between Hitachi and Mitsubishi Electric), ARM only creates and licenses its technology as intellectual property (IP), rather than manufacturing and selling its own physical CPUs, GPUs, SoCs or microcontrollers. This model is similar to those of fellow British design houses ARC International and Imagination Technologies, which have similarly been designing and licensing GPUs, CPUs, and SoCs, along with supplying tooling and various design and support services to its licensees.

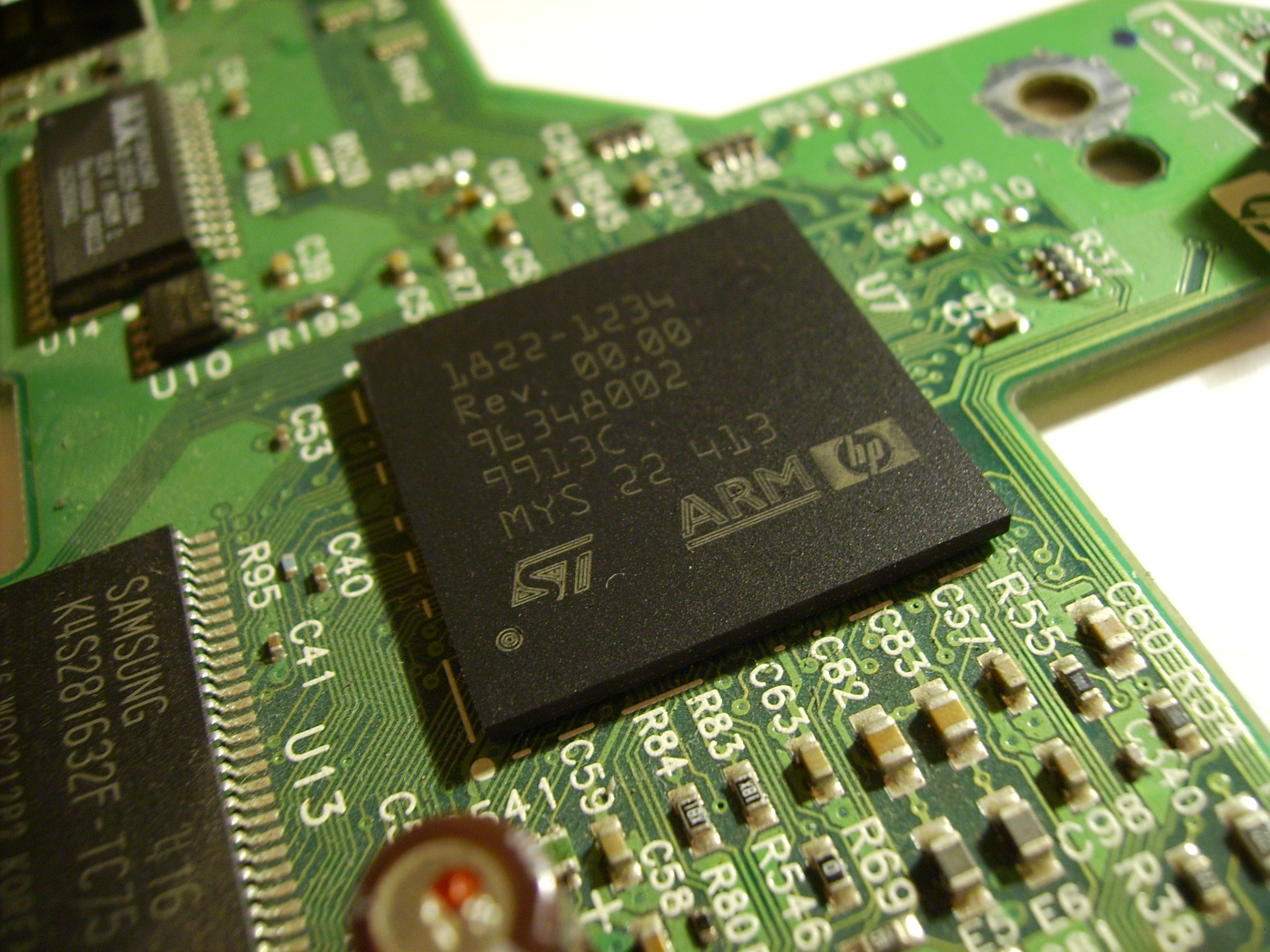
An ARM processor in a Hewlett-Packard PSC-1315 printer, produced for HP by STMicroelectronics

== Technology ==
A characteristic feature of Arm processors is their low electric power consumption, which makes them particularly suitable for use in portable devices.

Arm processors are used as the main CPU for most mobile phones many PDAs and handhelds, like the Apple iPod and iPad, and computer games and as well as many other applications, including GPS navigation devices, digital cameras and televisions.

=== Arm supercomputers ===
The world's fastest supercomputer, as of June 2026, the Chinese LineShine, is based on 304-core Armv9-based CPUs, and it also tops the HPCG list. An unprecedented 4 of top 10 fastest (of TOP500) are Arm-based, with the top one, the 5th fastest (4th in 2025), Europe's fastest JUPITER, and the 9th fastest supercomputer (previously fastest, in 2020, first Arm-based to reach the top) in 2026, the Japanese Fugaku is also based on Arm AArch64 architecture. At least 36 of the TOP500 list are now Arm-based supercomputers.

The supercomputer maker Cray has added an "ARM Option" (i.e. CPU blade option, using Cavium ThunderX2) to its XC50 supercomputers, and Cray claims that ARM is "a third processor architecture for building next-generation supercomputers", for clients such as the United States Department of Energy.

Fujitsu (the supercomputer maker of June 2011 world's fastest K computer according to TOP500) announced at the International Supercomputing Conference in June 2016 that its future exascale supercomputer will feature processors of its own design that implement the ARMv8 architecture, rather than the SPARC processors used in earlier supercomputers. These processors will also implement extensions to the ARMv8 architecture equivalent to HPC-ACE2 that Fujitsu is developing with ARM Holdings.

The Cray XC50-series supercomputer for the University of Bristol is called Isambard, named after Isambard Kingdom Brunel. The supercomputer is expected to feature around 160 nodes, each with two 32-core ThunderX2 processors running at 2.1 GHz. Peak theoretical performance of the 10,240 cores and 40,960 threads is 172 teraFLOPS.

The Vanguard project by Sandia National Laboratories is to deliver an exascale ARM machine. The first generation called Hammer was based on X-Gene by Applied Micro. The second generation called Sullivan was based Cavium's ThunderXs processors. The third generation called Mayer was based on pre-production ThunderX2. The fourth generation also based on ThunderX2 is called Astra and was slated to become operational by November 2018.

=== Neuromorphic technology ===
ARM968E-S was used to build the neuromorphic supercomputer, SpiNNaker (Spiking Neural Network Architecture).

== Products ==
Arm has four lines of central processing units (CPUs)/processors:

- Neoverse (infrastructure processors)
- Cortex-A (Application processors)
- Cortex-R (real-time processors)
- Cortex-M (microcontrollers)

It also has two lines of graphics processing units (GPUs): Mali, and the newer Immortalis (with hardware-based ray-tracing). In addition, it offers Ethos neural processing units (NPUs), Corelink/CoreSight System/SoC IP, and TrustZone/CryptoCell/SecurCore Security IP.

Arm offers several microprocessor core designs that have been "publicly licensed" for its newer "application processors" (non-microcontroller) used in such applications as smartphones and tablets.

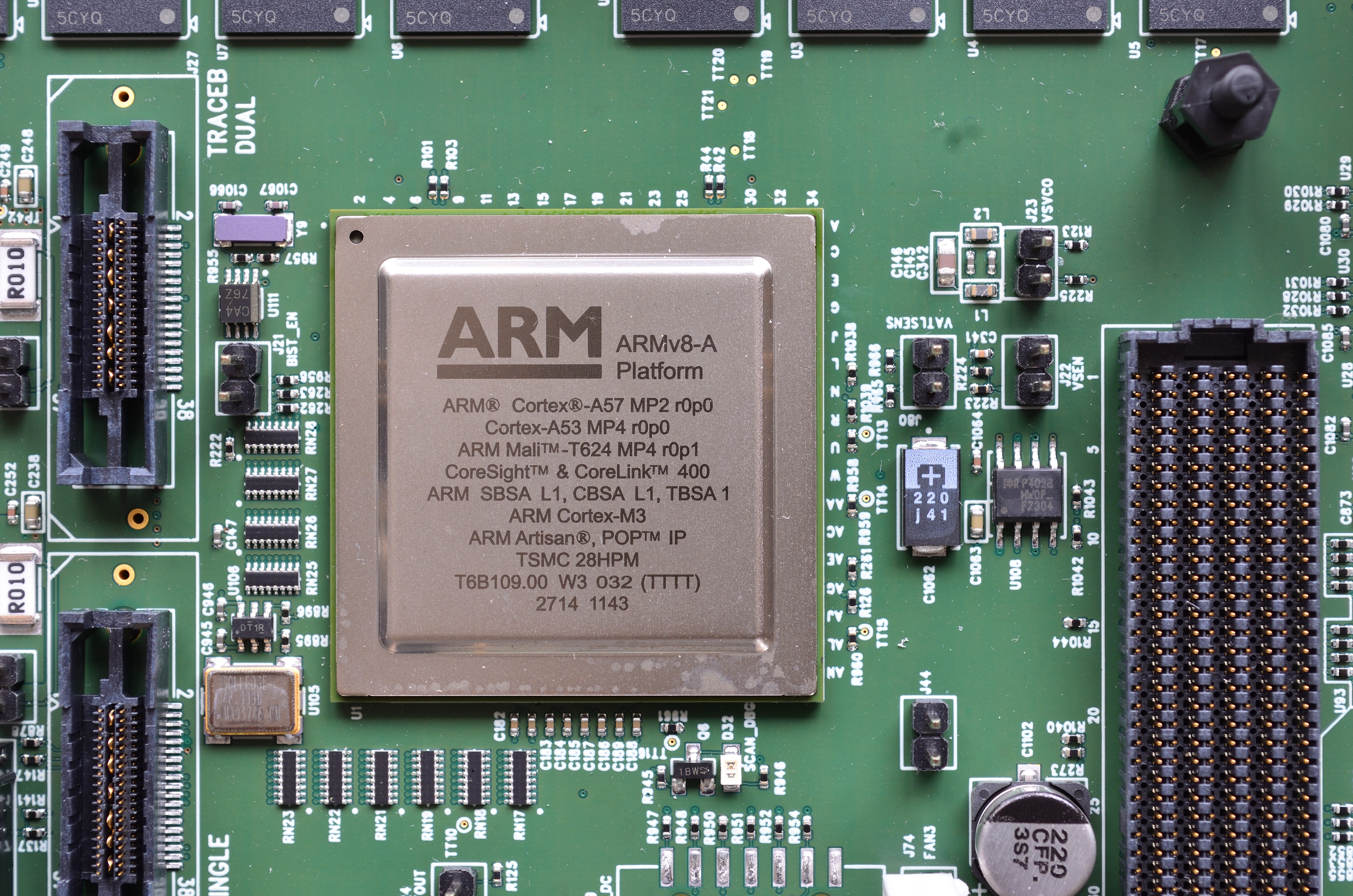
ARM Cortex A57 A53

Cores for ARMv8.2-A include the Cortex-A77, Cortex-A65AE, Cortex-A76, Cortex-A75 and Cortex-A55. Cores for ARMv8-A include the Cortex-A73, Cortex-A72, Cortex-A32, Cortex-A35, Cortex-A57 and Cortex-A53. ARM's client roadmap includes Hercules in 2020 and Matterhorn in 2021.

Cores for 32-bit architectures include Cortex-A32, Cortex-A15, Cortex-A12, Cortex-A17, Cortex-A9, Cortex-A8, Cortex-A7 and Cortex-A5, and older "Classic ARM Processors", as well as variant architectures for microcontrollers that include these cores: Cortex-R7, Cortex R5, Cortex-R4, Cortex-M35P, Cortex-M33, Cortex-M23 Cortex-M7, Cortex-M4, Cortex-M3, Cortex-M1, Cortex-M0+, and Cortex-M0 for licensing.

== Licensees ==
Companies often license these designs from Arm to manufacture and integrate into their own System on chip (SoC) with other components such as GPUs (sometimes Arm's Mali) or modem/radio basebands (for mobile phones). Arm offers multiple licensing programs for its cores. Arm also offers Artisan POP IP, where Arm partners with foundries to provide physical implementation, which allows faster time to market.

In February 2016, Arm announced the Built on Arm Cortex Technology licence often shortened to Built on Cortex (BoC) licence. This licence allows companies to partner with Arm and make modifications to Arm Cortex designs. These design modifications will not be shared with other companies. These semi-custom core designs also have brand freedom, for example Kryo 280.

In addition to licences for its core designs and BoC licence, Arm offers an "architectural licence" for its instruction set architectures, allowing the licensees to design their own cores that implement one of those instruction sets. An Arm architectural licence is more costly than a regular Arm core licence.

The Financial Times reported in March 2023 that Arm had planned to charge the licensees royalties based on the value of the device, instead of the prior model based on the chip's value.

=== Uses of Arm technology ===
Processors based on designs licensed from Arm, or designed by licensees of one of the ARM instruction set architectures, are used in all classes of computing devices (including in space). Processors designed by Arm or by Arm licensees are used as microcontrollers in embedded systems, including real-time safety systems (cars' ABS), biometrics systems (fingerprint sensor), smart TVs (e.g. Android TV), all modern smartwatches (such as Qualcomm Toq), and are used as general-purpose processors in smartphones, tablets, laptops, desktops (even for running traditional x86 Microsoft Windows programs), servers and supercomputers/HPC,

Systems, including iPhone smartphones, frequently include many chips, from many different providers, that include one or more licensed Arm cores, in addition to those in the main Arm-based processor. Arm's core designs are also used in chips that support many common network-related technologies in smartphones: Bluetooth, WiFi and broadband, in addition to corresponding equipment such as Bluetooth headsets, 802.11ac routers, and network providers' cellular LTE.

== Partnerships ==
=== University of Michigan ===
In 2011, Arm renewed a five-year, US$5 million research partnership with University of Michigan, which extended their existing research partnership to 2015. This partnership would focus on ultra-low energy and sustainable computing.

=== Arduino ===
In October 2017, Arduino announced its partnership with ARM. The announcement said, in part, "ARM recognized independence as a core value of Arduino ... without any lock-in with the ARM architecture." Arduino intends to continue to work with all technology vendors and architectures.

=== Intel ===
In October 2018, ARM Holdings partnered with Intel in order to share code for embedded systems through the Yocto Project. On 12 April 2023, ARM Holdings partnered with Intel Foundry Services to bring Arm SoCs to Intel's 18A process.

=== Mbed OS and Pelion ===
On 20 October 2018, Arm unveiled Arm Mbed OS, an open source operating system for IoT. On 8 October 2019, Arm announced a new Partner Governance model for partners to collaborate on the future roadmap. Partners include: Analog Devices, Cypress, Maxim Integrated, Nuvoton, NXP, Renesas, Realtek, Samsung, Silicon Labs and u-blox. In November 2020, Arm spun out the entire IoT software division as Pelion, a separate but wholly owned subsidiary of Arm. In October 2022 the IoT services of Pelion were purchased by Izuma Networks, an Austin, Texas based startup.

=== Autonomous Vehicle Computing Consortium (AVCC) ===
On 8 October 2019, Arm announced the Autonomous Vehicle Computing Consortium (AVCC) to collaborate and accelerate development of self-driving cars. Members include Arm, Bosch, Continental, Denso, General Motors, Nvidia, NXP and Toyota.

=== Defense Advanced Research Projects Agency (DARPA) ===
In August 2020, Arm signed a three-year agreement with DARPA, the US Defense Advanced Research Projects Agency, enabling DARPA researchers to use all of Arm's commercially available technology.

== Senior management ==
In October 2001, Warren East was appointed chief executive officer (CEO) of Arm Holdings. In the 2011 financial year, East received a total compensation of £1,187,500 from ARM, comprising a salary of £475,000 and a bonus of £712,500.

In May 2013, president Simon Segars took over as CEO.

In March 2014, former Rexam chairman Stuart Chambers succeeded John Buchanan as chairman. Chambers, a non-executive director of Tesco and former chief executive of Nippon Sheet Glass Group, had previously worked at Mars and Royal Dutch Shell.

On 8 February 2022, Rene Haas succeeded Segars as CEO with immediate effect, with Segars leaving Arm.

=== Current leadership ===
- Chair: Masayoshi Son (since September 2016)
- Chief Executive: Rene Haas (since February 2022)

==== List of former chairpersons ====
- Sir Robin Saxby (2001–2006)
- Doug Dunn (2006–2012)
- Sir John Buchanan (2012–2014)
- Stuart Chambers (2014–2016)

==== List of former chief executives ====
- Sir Robin Saxby (1991–2001)
- Warren East (2001–2013)
- Simon Segars (2013–2022)

== See also ==
- RISC-V
