= Torsten Schwede =

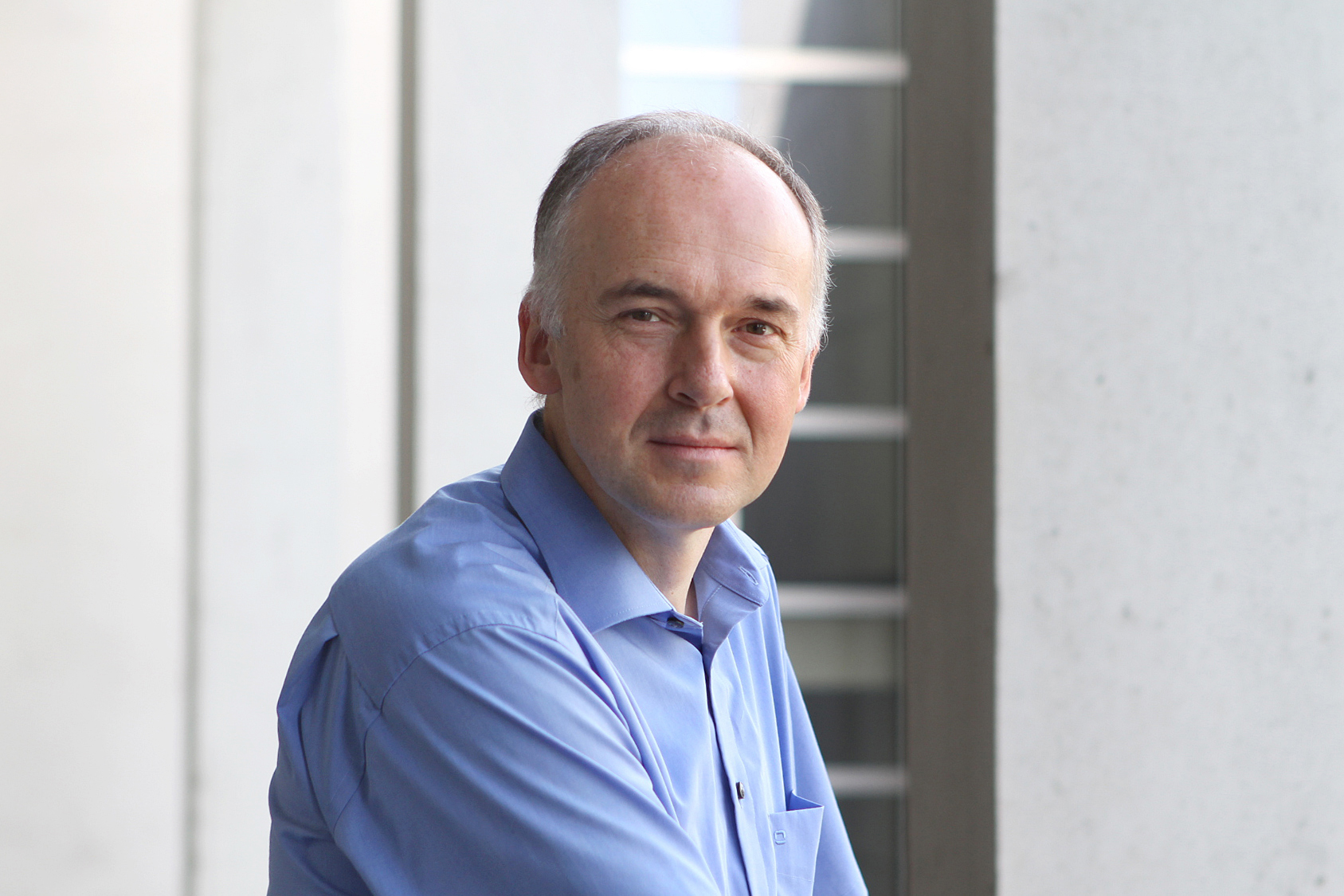
- Prof. Dr. Torsten Schwede (2015)
- Born: 2 October 1967 (age 58); Coburg, Germany
- Scientific career
- Fields: Bioinformatics
- Workplaces: University of Bayreuth, University of Freiburg, Swiss Institute of Bioinformatics, Biozentrum University of Basel

Torsten Schwede (born 2 October 1967 in Coburg) is a German and Swiss bioinformatics scientist and Professor at the Biozentrum of the University of Basel, Switzerland.

== Life ==
Torsten Schwede studied biochemistry at the University of Bayreuth and the University of Freiburg in Germany. After completing his PhD in 1998 he worked in research at the global pharmaceutical company GlaxoSmithKline in Geneva. In 2001, Torsten Schwede was appointed as Assistant Professor of Structural Bioinformatics to the Biozentrum, university of Basel. The following year he also became a group leader at the SIB Swiss Institute of Bioinformatics. In 2007 the bioinformatician became Associate Professor and 2018 Full Professor for Structural Bioinformatics at the Biozentrum. From 2014 to 2019 he was scientific director of sciCORE, responsible for the central infrastructure for scientific computing at the University of Basel. From 2018 to 2024, he was Vice-Rector for Research at the University of Basel, where his responsibilities included promoting young talent, internationalization, and digital research infrastructures. He has been the new President of the SNSF Research Council since 2025.

== Work ==
Torsten Schwede develops methods and algorithms to model the three-dimensional structures of proteins and their properties, in order to gain knowledge about their function at an atomic level. The main focus of his work is on methods for homology modeling, which allow the structure of proteins to be modeled using structures of experimentally characterized structures of homologues proteins as templates. Torsten Schwede has developed Swiss-model, a fully automated web server for modeling of protein structures which allows the prediction of protein structures based on experimentally characterized structures of homologues proteins. In order to estimate the accuracy of predicted structures, his group developed the QMEAN method for models of soluble and membrane proteins. He has initiated the CAMEO project for the continuous automated blind assessment of structure prediction techniques, which complements the activities of the biannual CASP experiment.

In addition to the prediction of protein structures, his group is working on modeling protein-ligand interactions. Using in-silico screening, they have been able to identify new potential inhibitors against the dengue virus. Through X-ray crystallography of the enzyme histidine ammonia-lyase (histidase). Torsten Schwede elucidated a novel electrophilic co-factor in enzymes, which is formed by the autocatalytic modification of the protein backbone.

== Awards and honors ==
- since 2025, President of the SNSF Research Council
- 2018 - 2024, Vice President for Research, University of Basel
- 2016 - 2019, Director, SPHN Data Coordination Center and BioMedIT project, SIB Swiss Institute of Bioinformatics
- 2014 - 2019, Director, sciCORE, University of Basel
- 2022 elected Member of the Academia Europaea
