= Metallopeptide =

Peptide that contains one or more metal ions in its structure

Metallopeptides (also called metal-peptides or metal peptide complexes) are peptides that contain one or more metal ions in their structure. This specific type of peptide are, just like metalloproteins, metallofoldamers. And very similar to metalloproteins, metallopeptide's functionality is attributed through the contained metal ion cofactor. These short structured peptides are often employed to develop mimics of metalloproteins and systems similar to artificial metalloenzymes.

A multitude of naturally occurring peptides display biological and chemical activities when bound to various metal ions. Where different metal ion cofactor can lead to different reactivity and even different folding and physical characteristics (e.g. solubility or stability) of the structure. Synthetic equivalents of such peptides are engineered to bind metal ions and display a variety of physical, chemical, and biological reactivity and characteristics.

== Examples ==
In the last 40 years, there has been a significant amount of research on metal binding peptides and their characteristics, structures, and chemical reactivities.

Vincent L. Pecoraro and his group investigate the interaction of peptides with heavy metals in the body; Katherine Franz leads a group studying Cu-binding peptides; Angela Lombardi and her unit focus on the development of artificial metalloenzymes and similar peptide systems, and the group of Peter Faller focuses on redox reactivity of Cu-peptides.

=== Natural ===
Natural metallopeptides with antibiotic, antimicrobial and anticancer properties have been of particular interest to the scientific community (e.g. the divalent bacitracin, histatin and Fe/Cu-bleomycin). At the same time there is an increasing attention to the role of metalloppeptides in disease development. For example, metallochemical interactions in brain tissue can contribute to neurodegenerative conditions due to the naturally high concentration of metal ions in the brain. Hence the metallochemical reactions occurring outside the physiologically healthy concentrations, can contribute to the development of diseases such as Alzheimer's disease. The condition is related to the β-amyloid metallopeptides. Another example are infectious prion polypeptides and specific isoforms of prion protein which contribute to disease transmission and development.

=== Artificial ===
De novo designed peptides which self-assemble in the presence of copper (Cu), forming supramolecular assemblies were presented by Korendovych et al. Additionally there are examples of metallopeptides that are, at least partially, composed of non-natural amino acids with possible applications in drug discovery and biomaterials.

== Metal coordination ==
Being a type of molecules that are often only activated for biological and chemical function following metal-binding, the specific coordination of metal ions imposes certain restrictions and requirements onto metallopeptides. Usually metal cofactors are coordinated by nitrogen, oxygen or sulfur centers belonging to amino acid residues of the peptide. These donor groups can be introduced by histidine (or the corresponding imidazole), cysteine (thiolate group), as well as carboxylate substituents (e.g. by aspartate) but are not limited to these. The other amino acid residues, including non-natural amino acids and the peptide backbone have been shown to bind metal centers and provide donor groups. The research on metal-binding of peptides ranges from coordination of biometals (such as Calcium, Magnesium, Manganese, Zinc, Sodium, Potassium, and Iron) to heavy metals (such as Arsenic, Mercury, and Cadmium).

== Synthesis and analysis ==
=== Biosynthesis ===
Peptides are synthesized in living organisms inside the cell analogously to proteins.

=== Chemical synthesis ===
Solid phase peptide synthesis (SPPS) is a well-established method for producing synthetic peptides. SPPS enables the building of a peptide chain by sequential interactions of amino acid derivatives.

=== Analysis ===
The interaction between metal ions and peptides are typically studied in solution using spectroscopic or electrochemical methods. Amongst which are circular dichroism (CD), nuclear magnetic resonance (NMR) spectroscopy, cyclic voltammetry, and mass spectrometry (MS).

== See also ==
- Bioinorganic chemistry
- Evolution of metal ions in biological systems
- Biometal (biology)
- Coenzyme
- Metalloproteins
