= Crans =

Crans may refer to:

== People with the surname ==
- Alissa Crans, American mathematician
- Debbie C. Crans (born 1955), Danish-American chemist
- Jan Crans (born 1480), Flemish painter

== Places ==
France:

- Crans, Ain, a commune in the Ain département
- Crans, Jura, a commune in the Jura département

Switzerland:

- Crans-Montana (Crans-sur-Sierre), municipality and ski resort in the canton of Valais
- Crans-près-Céligny, a small municipality in the canton of Vaud
