= Biometal (biology) =

Metal in biology, biochemistry, and medicine

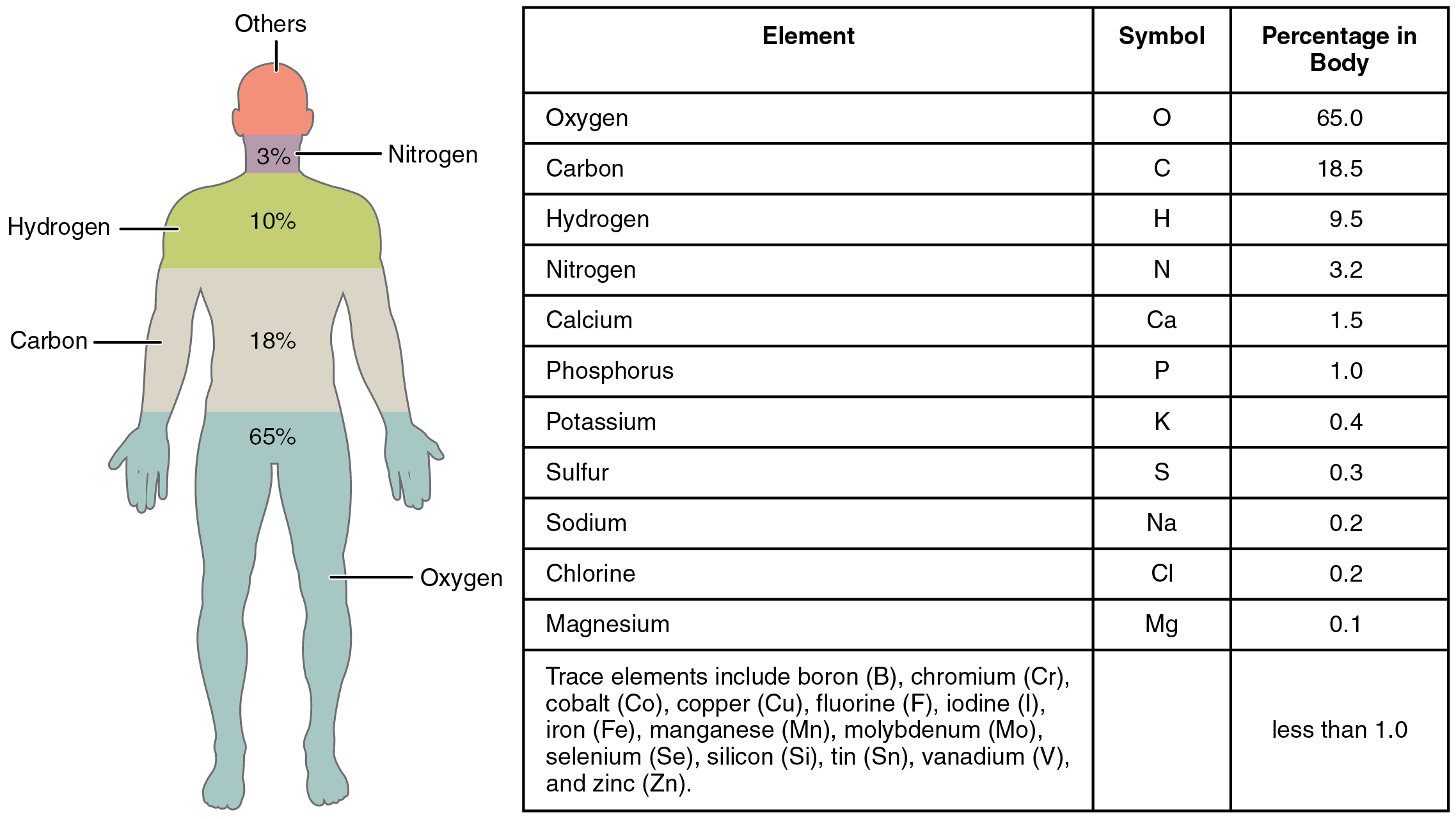
Element percentages in the human body.

Biometals (also called biocompatible metals, bioactive metals, metallic biomaterials) are metals normally present, in small but important and measurable amounts, in biology, biochemistry, and medicine. The metals copper, zinc, iron, and manganese are examples of metals that are essential for the normal functioning of most plants and the bodies of most animals, such as the human body. A few (calcium, potassium, sodium) are present in relatively larger amounts, whereas most others are trace metals, present in smaller but important amounts (the image shows the percentages for humans). Approximately 2/3 of the existing periodic table is composed of metals with varying properties, accounting for the diverse ways in which metals (usually in ionic form) have been utilized in nature and medicine.

== History ==
At first, the study of biometals was referred to as bioinorganic chemistry. Each branch of bioinorganic chemistry studied separate, particular sub-fields of the subject. However, this led to an isolated view of each particular aspect in a biological system. This view was revised into a holistic approach of biometals in metallomics.

Metal ions in biology were studied in various specializations. In nutrition, it was to define the essentials for life; in toxicology, to define how the adverse effects of certain metal ions in biological systems and in pharmacology for their therapeutic effects. In each field, at first, they were studied and separated on a basis of concentration. In low amounts, metal ions in a biological system could perform at their optimal functionality whereas in higher concentrations, metal ions can prove fatal to biological systems. However, the concentration gradients were proved to be arbitrary as low concentrations of non-essential metals (like lithium or helium) in essential metals (like sodium or potassium) can cause an adverse effect in biological systems and vice versa.

Investigations into biometals and their effects date back to the 19th century and even further back to the 18th century with the identification of iron in blood. Zinc was identified to be essential in fungal growth of yeast as shown by Jules Raulin in 1869 yet no proof for the need of zinc in human cells was shown until the late 1930s where its presence was demonstrated in carbonic anhydrase and the 1960s where it was identified as a necessary element for humans. Since then, understanding of zinc in human biology has advanced to the point that it is considered as important as iron. Modern advancements in analytical technology have made it clear the importance of biometals in signalling pathways and the initial thoughts on the chemical basis of life.

== Naturally occurring biometals ==
Metal ions are essential to the function of many proteins present in living organisms, such as metalloproteins and enzymes that require metal ions as cofactors. Processes including oxygen transport and DNA replication are carried out using enzymes such as DNA polymerase, which in humans requires magnesium and zinc to function properly. Other biomolecules also contain metal ions in their structure, such as iodine in human thyroid hormones.

The uses of some of them are listed below. The list is not exhaustive, because it covers only the principal class members; others that are trace metals of especially low bioconcentration are not explored herein. Some elements that are nonmetals or metalloids (such as selenium) are beyond the scope of this article.

=== Calcium ===
Calcium is the most abundant metal in the eukaryotes and by extension humans. The body is made up of approximate 1.5% calcium and this abundance is reflected in its lack of redox toxicity and its participation in the structure stability of membranes and other biomolecules. Calcium plays a part in fertilization of an egg, controls several developmental process and may regulate cellular processes like metabolism or learning. Calcium also plays a part in bone structure as the rigidity of vertebrae bone matrices are akin to the nature of the calcium hydroxyapatite. Calcium usually binds with other proteins and molecules in order to perform other functions in the body. The calcium bound proteins usually play an important role in cell-cell adhesion, hydrolytic processes (such as hydrolytic enzymes like glycosidases and sulfatases) and protein folding and sorting. These processes play into the larger part of cell structure and metabolism.

=== Magnesium ===
Magnesium is the most abundant free cation in plant cytosol, is the central atom in chlorophyll and offers itself as a bridging ion for the aggregation of ribosomes in plants. Even small changes in the concentration of magnesium in plant cytosol or chloroplasts can drastically affect the key enzymes present in the chloroplasts. It is most commonly used as a co-factor in eukaryotes and functions as an important functional key in enzymes like RNA Polymerase and ATPase. In phosphorylating enzymes like ATPase or kinases and phosphates, magnesium acts as a stabilizing ion in polyphosphate compounds due its Lewis acidity. Magnesium has also been noted as a possible secondary messenger for neural transmissions. Magnesium acts as an allosteric inhibitor for the enzyme vacuolar pyrophosphatase (V-PP_{i}ase). In vitro, the concentration of free magnesium acts as a strict regulator and stabilizer for the enzyme activity of V-PP_{i}ase.

=== Manganese ===
Manganese like magnesium plays a crucial role as a co-factor in various enzymes though its concentration is noticeably lower than the other. Enzymes that use manganese as a co-factor are known as "manganoproteins." These proteins include enzymes, like oxidoreductases, transferases and hydrolases, which are necessary for metabolic functions and antioxidant responses. Manganese plays a significant role in host defense, blood clotting, reproduction, digestion and various other functions in the body. In particular, when concerning host defense, manganese acts as a preventative measure for oxidative stress by destroying free radicals which are ions that have an unpaired electron in their outer shells.

=== Zinc ===
Zinc is the second most abundant transition metal present in living organisms second only to iron. It is critical for the growth and survival of cells. In humans, zinc is primarily found in various organs and tissues such as the brain, intestines, pancreas and mammary glands. In prokaryotes, zinc can function as an antimicrobial, zinc oxide nano-particles can function as an antibacterial or antibiotic. Zinc homeostasis is highly controlled to allow for its benefits without risk of death via its high toxicity. Because of zinc's antibiotic nature, it is often used in many drugs against bacterial infections in humans. Inversely, due to the bacterial nature of mitochondria, zinc antibiotics are also lethal to mitochondria and results in cell death at high concentrations. Zinc is also used in a number of transcription factors, proteins and enzymes.

=== Sodium ===
Sodium is a metal where humans have discovered a great deal of its total roles in the body as well as being one of the only two alkali metals that play a major role in the bodily functions. It plays an important role in maintenance of the cell membrane potential and the electrochemical gradient in the body via the sodium-potassium pump and sodium-glucose transport proteins. Sodium also serves a purpose in the nervous system and cell communication as they flood into axons during an action potential to preserve the strength of the signal. It has also been shown that sodium affects immune response both in efficiency and speed. Macrophages have increased proliferation rates at high-salt concentrations and the body uses high-sodium concentrations in isolated regions to generate an heightened immune response which fades after the infection has been dealt with.

=== Potassium ===
In plants, potassium plays a key role in maintaining plant health. High concentrations of potassium in plants play a key role in synthesis of essential proteins in plants as well as development of plant organelles like cell walls to prevent damage from viruses and insects. It also lowers the concentration of low molecular weight molecules like sugars and amino acids and increases the concentration of high weight molecular weight molecules like protein which also prevent the development and propagation of viruses. Potassium absorption has a positive correlation with aquaporins and the uptake of water in plant cells via cell membrane proteins. Because of this correlation, it has been noted that potassium also plays a key part in stomatal movement and regulation as high concentrations of potassium are moved into the plant stomata to keep them open and promote photosynthesis. In animals, potassium also plays a key part along with sodium in maintaining resting cell membrane potential and in cell-cell communication via repolarization of axon pathways after an action potential between neurons. Potassium may also play a key part in maintaining blood pressure in animals as shown in a study where increased severity of periodontal disease and hypertension were inversely correlated to urinary potassium excretion (a telltale sign of low potassium intake).

=== Iron ===
Iron is also the most abundant transition metal in the human body and it is used in various processes like oxygen transport and ATP production. It plays a key role in the function of enzymes like cytochrome a, b and c as well as iron-sulfur complexes which play an important role in ATP production. It is present in every type of cell in the brain as the brain itself has a very high energy requirement and by extension a very high iron requirement. In animals, iron plays a very important role in transporting oxygen from the lungs to tissues and CO_{2} from tissues to the lungs. It does this via two important transport proteins called hemoglobin and myoglobin. Hemoglobin in the blood transports oxygen from the lungs to myoglobin in tissues. Both proteins are tetramer complexes with iron protein complexes called hemes built into each subunit of the tetramer. The oxygen binds to the iron in the heme via affinity-based binding or liganding and dissociates from the protein once it has reached its destination. Iron can also be a potential carcinogen in three ways; first being the production of hydroxyl radicals. Ferric ions can be reduced via superoxide and the product can be reoxidized via peroxide to form hydroxyl radicals. Hydroxyl radicals and other reactive oxygen species when generated near DNA can cause point mutations, cross-linkage and breaks. The second being the bolstering of the growth of neoplastic cells by suppressing host defenses. Excessive iron inhibits the activity of CD_{4} lymphocytes and suppresses the tumoricidal activity of macrophages. The third way it can act as a carcinogen is by functioning as an essential nutrient for unrestricted proliferation of tumor cells.

=== Lithium ===
Lithium is present in biological systems in trace amounts; its functions are uncertain. Lithium salts have proven to be useful as a mood stabilizer and antidepressant in the treatment of mental illness such as bipolar disorder.

== Non-natural biometal complexes ==
The term biometal can be used as a synonym to a metallic element that is involved in the function of a biomolecule, hence also artificial systems can be considered when talking about biometals. Systems such as metalloproteins, metallopeptides and artificial metalloenzymes are examples of biomolecules containing metallic elements. The de novo design of structures involving metals in the function of the biomolecule itself is done in a biomimetic fashion but also to enable non-natural activity in biomolecules.

== Biometals in medicine ==
Metal ions and metallic compounds are often used in medical treatments and diagnoses. Compounds containing metal ions can be used as medicine, such as lithium compounds and auranofin. Metal compounds and ions can also produce harmful effects on the body due to the toxicity of several types of metals. For example, arsenic works as a potent poison due to its effects as an enzyme inhibitor, disrupting ATP production. On the other hand, Ni–Ti–Cu wires are used for artificial heart muscles and iron and gold particles can guide magnetic drug delivery or destroy tumor cells.

Bigger biometal structures (relying on metallic elements and alloys) in medicine can be classified into three types: fibre, bulk scaffolds, and nanotubes. And in some cases the term biometal is also used to refer to metal system with application in biomedicine not directly correlated to the biochemical function of biomolecules but to the biocompatibility of these metal systems. Examples are scaffolds of stainless steel or titanium alloy to create screws or plates for osteosynthesis, and titanium bulk for precise engineering of bone tissue. For analytical purposes biometals can be employed in magnetic separation of different materials.
