= Commercially pure =

Commercially pure materials, usually metals, are ones that have been purified to a practical extent, sufficient for commercial purposes; that is, they are close to absolute/theoretical purity albeit with some low-but-nonzero tolerance for impurities (such as trace metals) that allows for their economically viable production cost.

Major examples include:

- Commercially pure titanium: see Titanium § Commercially pure titanium
- Commercially pure zinc: see Zinc § Commercially pure zinc
- Commercially pure aluminium: see Aluminium § Applications
