= Antonio Frontera =

Spanish theoretical and computational chemist

- Born: Antonio Frontera Beccaria
- Citizenship: Spanish
- Education: University of the Balearic Islands (PhD)
- Known for: Research on non-covalent interactions, σ-hole and π-hole interactions, tetrel bonding and spodium bonding
- Awards: Humboldt Research Award (2022)
- Scientific career
- Fields: Theoretical chemistry, computational chemistry, supramolecular chemistry, organic chemistry
- Workplaces: University of the Balearic Islands
- Doctoral advisor: José Manuel Saá Rodríguez; Pere Maria Deyà Serra; Jeroni Morey Salva

Antonio Frontera Beccaria is a Spanish theoretical and computational chemist and professor of organic chemistry at the University of the Balearic Islands. His work includes studies of tetrel, aerogen and spodium bonding, and the application of computational methods to molecular recognition, crystal engineering and materials chemistry.

He was a recipient of the 2022 Humboldt Research Award.

== Education and career ==
Frontera studied chemistry at the University of the Balearic Islands. He received his doctorate in chemical sciences in 1994.

From 1995 to 1996, he conducted postdoctoral research at Yale University in the research group of William L. Jorgensen. He began his independent research career at the University of the Balearic Islands in 2000.

At UIB, Frontera co-leads the Supramolecular Chemistry group and directs its Theoretical Chemistry Laboratory.

In a 2020 interview with the Spanish newspaper Última Hora, he discussed his position as president of U Energia, a Mallorcan electricity and telecommunications company, and his involvement in the family business.

== Research ==
Frontera's research include the study of σ-hole and π-hole interactions. These describe non-covalent interactions involving regions of positive electrostatic potential on atoms or molecular frameworks. His research has examined the energetic and structural characteristics of these interactions and their influence on molecular assembly.

In 2013, Frontera, Antonio Bauzá and Tiddo J. Mooibroek published a study of tetrel bonding, a class of non-covalent interactions involving group 14 elements acting as electron acceptors. The study examined the directional nature of these interactions and their relationship to other σ-hole-based intermolecular forces.

In a 2020 review published in Coordination Chemistry Reviews, Frontera and Bauzá examined theoretical and experimental evidence for σ-hole and π-hole noble gas bonding interactions, including their role in the structures of xenon compounds.

In 2020, Frontera and collaborators introduced the term spodium bond to describe attractive non-covalent interactions involving group 12 elements and electron-rich atoms or groups.

In 2021, he co-authored a study of σ-hole interactions in derivatives of group 8 elements, including osmium compounds. A 2024 study involving Frontera investigated π-hole interactions involving transition-metal-containing porphyrins and their supramolecular assemblies.

In 2025, Chemical & Engineering News reported on research led by Alessandro Bismuto and Frontera involving the synthesis and crystallographic characterization of methylenedistibiranes, three-membered heterocycles containing two antimony atoms and one carbon atom.

== Awards and recognition ==
Frontera was a recipient of the 2022 Humboldt Research Award from the Alexander von Humboldt Foundation. His research sponsorship in Germany began in June 2023, with Rainer Streubel of the University of Bonn serving as his academic host.
