= International Vanadium Symposium =

Biennial interdisciplinary event

The International Vanadium Symposium is a biennial international event. The symposium is an interdisciplinary event for a wide range of chemistry researchers that share interest in vanadium research to network and share ideas. The first meeting of the International Vanadium Symposium occurred in 1997 in Cancun, Mexico, and the most recent meeting was in Lisbon, Portugal in 2023.

== Meetings ==
- 1997: Cancun
- 1999: Berlin
- 2001: Osaka
- 2004: Szeged
- 2006: San Francisco
- 2008: Lisbon
- 2010: Toyama
- 2012: Arlington
- 2014: Padua
- 2016: Taipei
- 2018: Montevideo
- 2020: Cyprus
- 2023: Lisbon

== Vanadis Award ==
The Vanadis Award is an international award that is presented to a researcher involved in vanadium research at the International Vanadium Symposium. The award is given to a researcher that has performed innovative research, developed new applications, has a large influence, a wide research scope, and has served for the advancement of vanadium science.

=== Recipients ===
- 2004: Debbie C. Crans
- 2006: Dieter Rheder
- 2008: Toshikazu Hairo
- 2010: Vincent Pecoraro
- 2012: Israel Wachs
- 2014: João Costa Pessoa
- 2016: Ron Wever and Tamas Kiss
- 2018: Armando Pombeiro
- 2021(Given retroactively in 2023): Alison Butler
- 2023: Dinorah Gambino

== Notable people ==
As of the 11th International Vanadium Symposium meeting, Dr. Dinorah Gambino served as chair. Some notable speakers from the most recent conference (2018) are Debbie C. Crans of Colorado State University, Miguel Bañares of the Spanish National Research Council, Peter Lay from the University of Sydney, Alison Butler of University of California, Santa Barbara, Hiroaki Sasai from Osaka University, and João Costa Pessoa from Universidade de Lisboa.
