= Debbie C. Crans =

Professor of chemistry

Debbie Catharina Crans
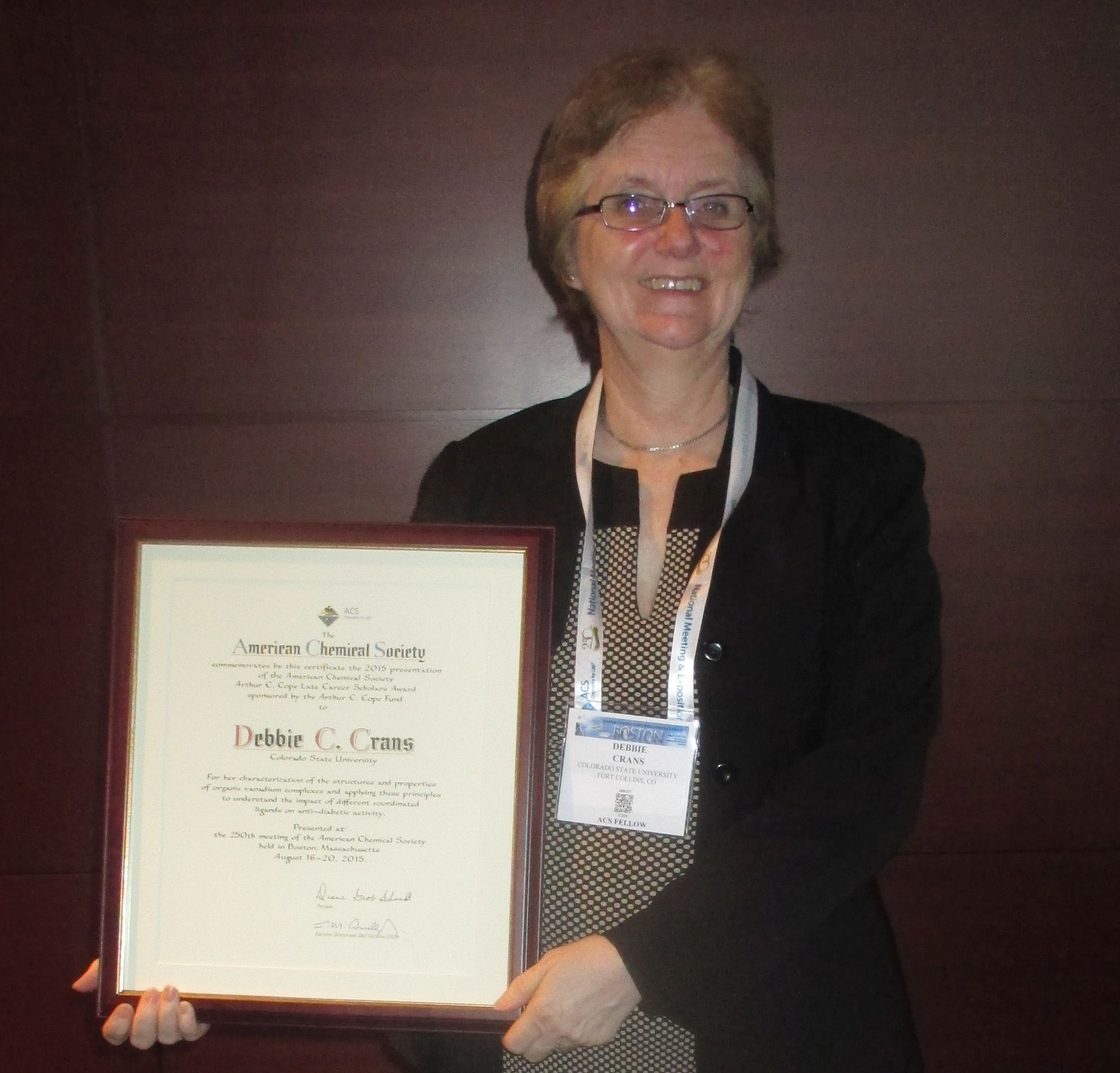
- Debbie Crans after receiving her 2015 Cope Scholar Award
- Born: August 13, 1955 (age 71)

Academic background
- Education: Harvard University (Ph.D. 1985); University of Copenhagen (B.S. 1978)
- Thesis: Methodology in Enzyme-Catalyzed Organic Synthesis: Glycerol Kinase Catalyzed Phosphorylations (1985)
- Doctoral advisor: George M. Whitesides
- Other advisors: James P. Snyder, Paul von Ragué Schleyer, Orville L. Chapman, Paul D. Boyer
- Website: wp.natsci.colostate.edu/crans/

Debbie C. Crans is a professor of Organic, Inorganic and Biological Chemistry and of Cell and Molecular Biology at Colorado State University, where she also is a Professor Laureate of the College of Natural Sciences. Crans specializes in the fundamental chemistry and biochemistry of drugs, with particular focus on vanadium and other transition metal ions as metals in medicine and investigation of their mechanisms of toxicity.

== Education ==
Debbie Crans studied at the University of Copenhagen, studying for her Cand. Scient. 1. part (B.S.) in 1974–1978, then her Cand. Scient. 2. part (research) in 1978–1980. During this time, she worked with Prof. James P. Snyder at Copenhagen, and Prof. Paul von Ragué Schleyer at the University of Erlangen–Nuremberg in Germany on computational studies of free radicals. She then moved to Harvard University in the United States to pursue graduate studies in the laboratory of Prof. George M. Whitesides. At Harvard, Crans worked on enzyme-catalyzed phosphorylation reactions, using glycerol kinase to synthesize chiral analogs of glycerol. She graduated with her Ph.D. in 1985. She went on to do postdoctoral work with Orville L. Chapman and Paul D. Boyer at the University of California, Los Angeles from 1985 to 1986, studying the mechanistic enzymology of the F_{1} subunit of ATP synthase from chloroplasts and beef heart.

== Independent career and research ==
Crans began her independent career as an assistant professor at Colorado State University in 1987. She was promoted to associate professor in 1991, and full professor in 1998.

Crans is known for her work on the role of vanadium in biological systems, especially the effects of its compounds on diabetes. She has worked as senior editor several books on vanadium, such as Vanadium Compounds: Chemistry, Biochemistry, and Therapeutic Applications, Vanadium: The Versatile Metal and Vanadium in Biochemistry. Crans served as chair of the American Chemical Society in 2015 and 2016. She has also been associate editor for the New Journal of Chemistry, Inorganic Chemistry, the Journal of Inorganic Biochemistry and Coordination Chemistry Reviews.

Crans has contributed to over 215 peer-reviewed articles. As of spring 2019, her work has been cited 7,200 times excluding self-citations making her h-index of 53. Her review paper, "The chemistry and biochemistry of vanadium and the biological activities exerted by vanadium compounds" has been cited over 900 times. Her study on "Effects of vanadium complexes with organic ligands on glucose metabolism: a comparison study in diabetic rats" describes the use of vanadium compounds as hypoglycemic agents, and it has been widely cited.

== Awards ==
=== International Awards ===
- 2019 ACS Award for Distinguished Service in the Advancement of Inorganic Chemistry
- 2015 Arthur C. Cope Scholar Award
- 2012 Lectureship award, Japanese Coordination Chemistry Society
- 2004 Vanadis award from the International Vanadium Symposium in Szeged
- 2000 Japan Society of Promotion of Science award
- 2000 Alexander Humboldt Senior Research awardee

=== National Awards ===
- 2017 ChemLuminary Awards Young Chemists Committee
- 2016 Royal Society Fellow
- 2014 AAAS Fellow
- 2009 ACS Fellow
- 1993-96 Alfred P. Sloan Research Fellow
- 1994 Alberta Heritage Foundation award
- 1990-1992 Eli Lilly Young Investigator Award
- 1989-1994 National Institutes of Health FIRST award

== Personal life ==
She currently resides in Northern Colorado with her husband and three daughters. One daughter is pursuing the PhD in chemistry at Northwestern University, one is an undergraduate student at Colorado State University, and one works as a financial planner.
