= Vincent L. Pecoraro =

American chemist

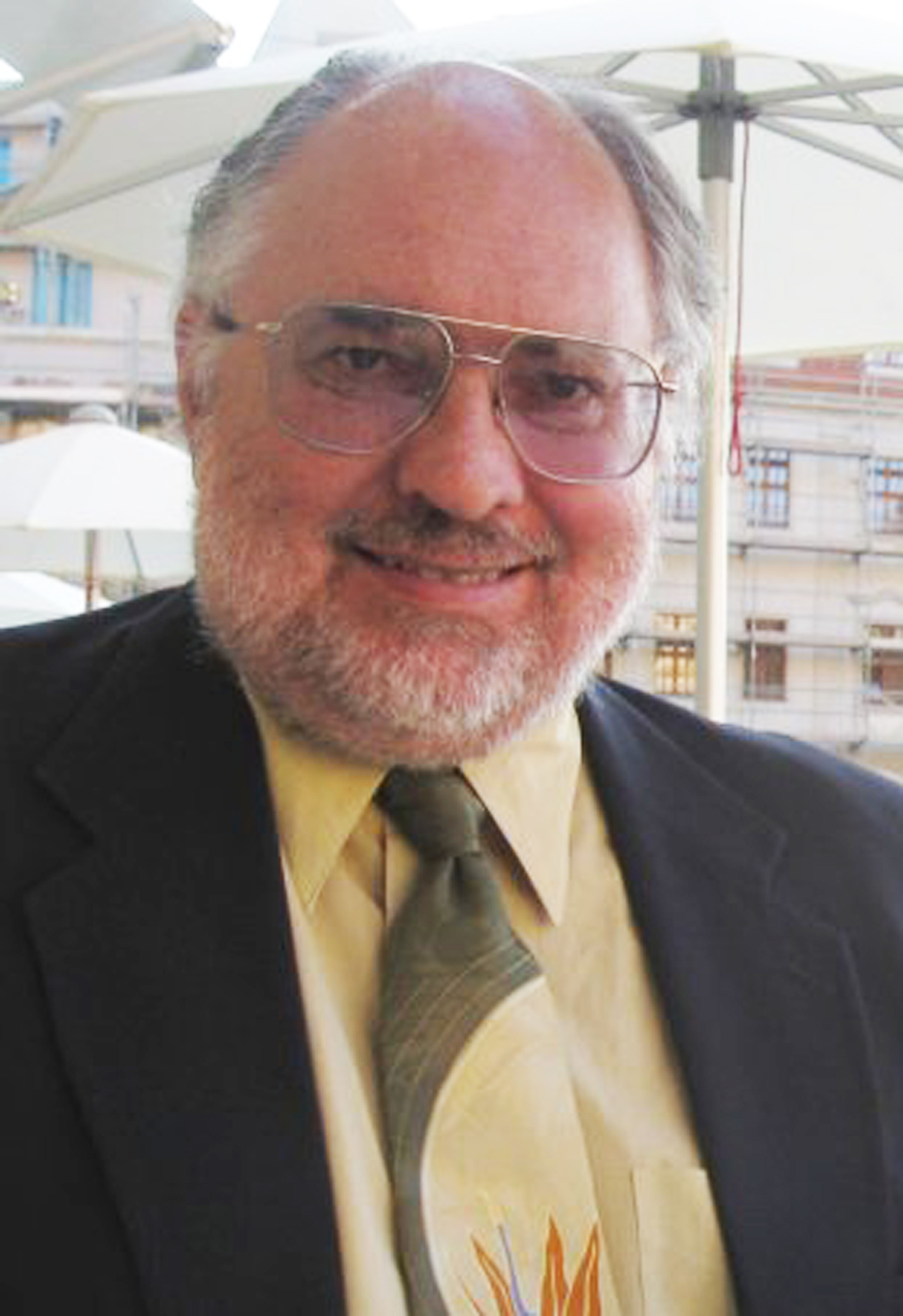
Vincent L. Pecoraro

Vincent L. Pecoraro, professor at the University of Michigan, is a researcher in bioinorganic chemistry and inorganic chemistry. He is a specialist in the chemistry and biochemistry of manganese, vanadium, and metallacrown chemistry. He is a fellow of the American Association for the Advancement of Science

== Biography ==
Pecoraro was born in Freeport, NY in August 1956; shortly after, his family relocated to California where he spent the majority of his childhood. On completing high school, he continued his education at the University of California, Los Angeles graduating with his B.S. in biochemistry in 1977 and pursued his Ph.D. in chemistry at the University of California, Berkeley working under Ken Raymond. After gaining his Ph.D., he worked with W. Wallace Cleland at the University of Wisconsin-Madison for a three-year post-doc. In 1984, he was appointed assistant professor in the University of Michigan Department of Chemistry.

== Scientific Achievements ==
=== Metallacrown ===
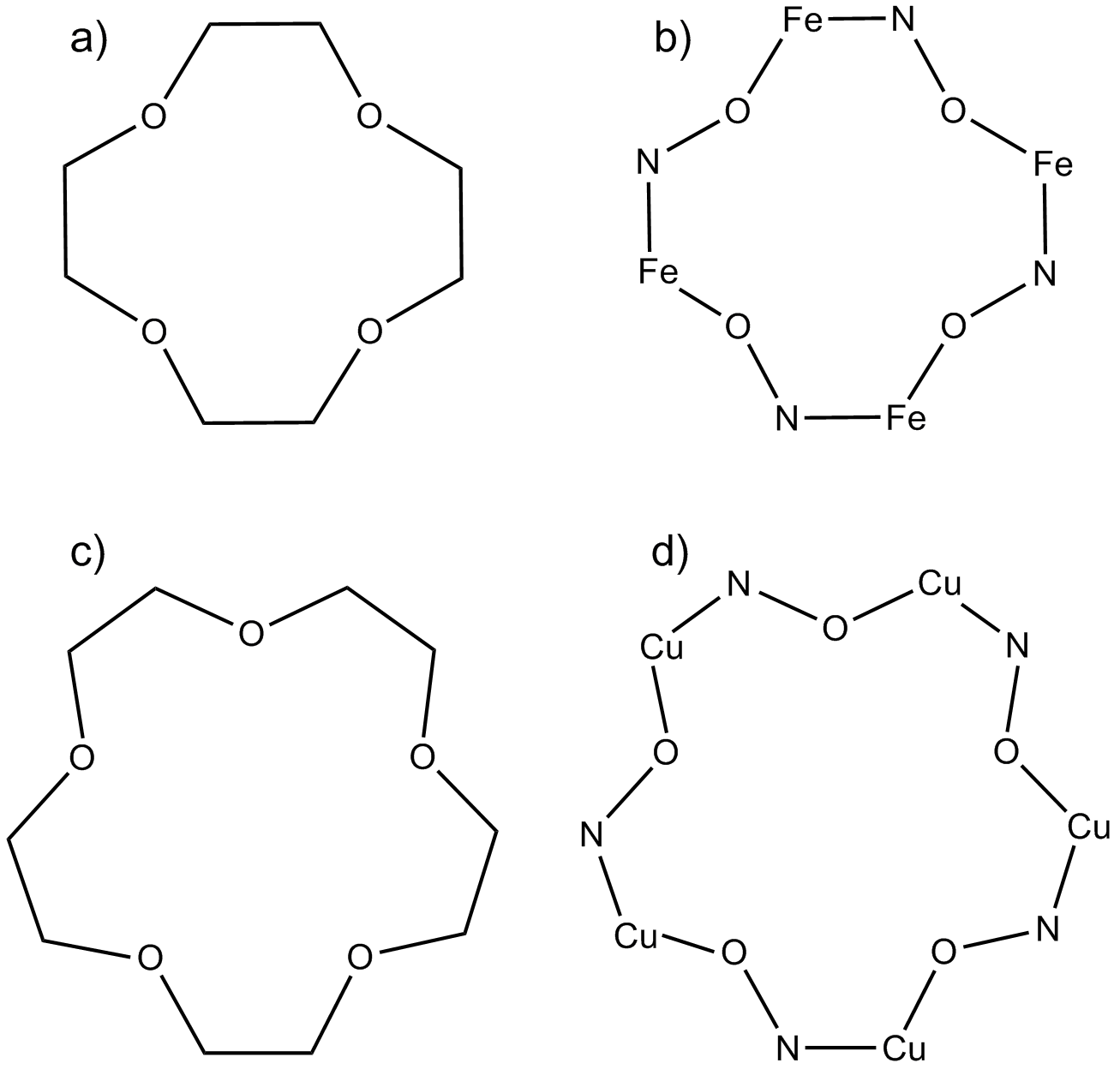
Metallacrowns and related organic crown ethers a) 12-crown-4 b)12-MCFe(III)N-4 c) 15-crown-5 d) 15-MCCu(II)N-5

Metallacrowns are a class of cyclic compounds that contain metal ions and non-metals in repeating units. Vincent L. Pecoraro and Myoung Soo Lah reported the first metallacrown in 1989 and these compounds have since grown into their own field of research with numerous new applications. One of the most interesting aspects of these compounds is their diversity. The ring size can be changed by incorporating new ligands or different metals into the frame work, which leads to the internal cavity also changing size. As such, specific ions can be selectively trapped in the center by tuning the structure of the metallacrown and also, by changing the environment, such as the solvent. Due to these unique properties and the inherent greenness associated with metallacrown synthesis (typically high yield, one step, benign solvent), this is still an active research topic for the Pecoraro group and many other scientists around the world.

The Pecoraro group is currently working on using metallacrowns with selective binding for a variety of biological applications. One application is using metallacrowns for medicinal imaging. Currently, gadolinium (Gd) is used in MRI as a contrasting agent in combination with a chelating ligand. Unfortunately, if Gd is freed from its chelating agent, Gd is rather toxic to humans. These gadolinium chelates present many health hazards and can even lead to death, though it is an uncommon occurrence and typically is only seen in patients with kidney issues. Luckily, this same metal can also be selectively and very strongly trapped in a metallacrown motif. Currently, the group is working on subjecting this system to a variety of conditions as seen in the body such as different pH's and also, various compounds and metals that may also bind to the metallacrown to ensure that the toxic Gd is not displaced from the metallacrown. Other potential uses of metallacrowns in the body include hydrolyzing phosphate diesters, a key linkage component in RNA and DNA.

Another part of the Pecoraro group research with metallacrowns focuses on their application as single-molecule magnet. Metallacryptate can be thought of as a metallacrown in three dimensions with a manganese oxide trapped in the middle. The most interesting thing about this compound is that this molecule acts like a single-molecule magnet. Currently, the group is continuing to work on fully understanding this system with the ultimate goal of applying it to memory storage devices.

Investigating for Lanthanide separation

=== Manganese ===
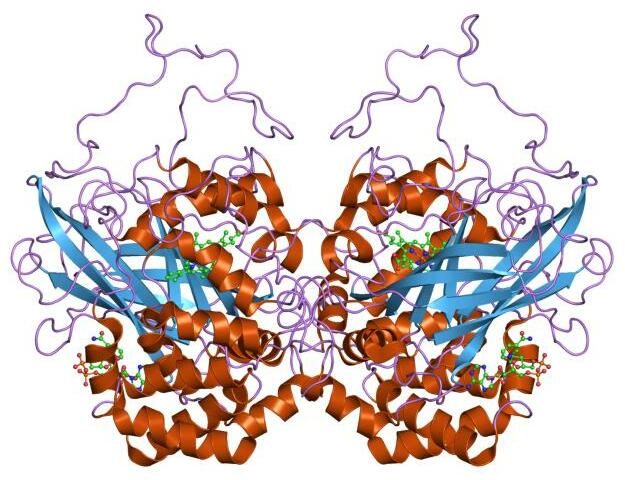
Catalase structure

The Pecoraro group is also investigating the role of manganese in biological systems with particular interest in manganese (Mn) based enzymes. These enzymes have a wide variety of critical roles in the body including acting as an anti-oxidant (superoxide dismutase) and protecting the cell from oxidation damage (catalase). The group is also studying the oxygen evolving complex, which catalyzes the oxidation of water. This compound plays a key role in plant photosynthesis of converting CO_{2} and water to form sugars.

The Pecoraro group approaches these manganese based compounds by first creating model systems and studying them. The group was able to synthesize a dimanganese complex where the Mn atoms had the same separation as that found in the oxygen evolving complex (OEC) while also having a similar ligand environment. This compound has also been shown to have similar catalytic activity to that of catalase. The information gained from this system has led to new proposals regarding how the OEC occurs. One mechanism involves successive oxidations of OEC by hydrogen abstraction. The group tested the viability of this mechanism via use of thermodynamic calculations and studies of their mock system to find that this is indeed a possible mechanism. This dimeric system was also found to exist with variety of different manganese oxidation states. These oxidation states have also been shown to exist in catalase. By observing the binding of a hydroxide to one of the manganese, an unsymmetrical dimer is created.

=== Vanadium ===
His group has interest in vanadium for bioinorganic applications. Vanadium can be naturally found in enzymes within certain marine animals. One of these enzyme types, nitrogenases, are responsible for converting nitrogen gas to ammonia and can then be accessed by plants, which is critical to their development. The other type, haloperoxidases, takes bromine from seawater along with hydrogen peroxide and converts them into organobromine compounds. These unique vanadium complexes, as well as others are found in some terrestrial beings such as mushrooms. Additionally, these compounds may provide very useful for humans as they have been found to help people with diabetes by improving glucose control. The Pecoraro group has taken these interesting applications of vanadium and started research to more fully understand them. In particular, the haloperoxidases have been a main focus on research. First, the group synthesized vanadium complexes to mock the vanadium haloperoxidases in order to gain an understanding of the mechanism. Not only did their system efficiently catalyze the reaction, but they were also able to collect valuable kinetic data and come up with a proposed catalytic cycle as seen below. The information showed that an acid/base was necessary for catalysis to occur. With this information in hand, efforts are underway to understand how these complexes are activated naturally to allow halide oxidation. Also, they are working to understand the structures of the inactive forms of these vanadium based haloperoxidases. This information will provide significant insight into how these vanadium haloperoxidases are found and operate in these biological systems, which will in turn take the group one step closer to being able to apply vanadium compounds to diabetes treatment.

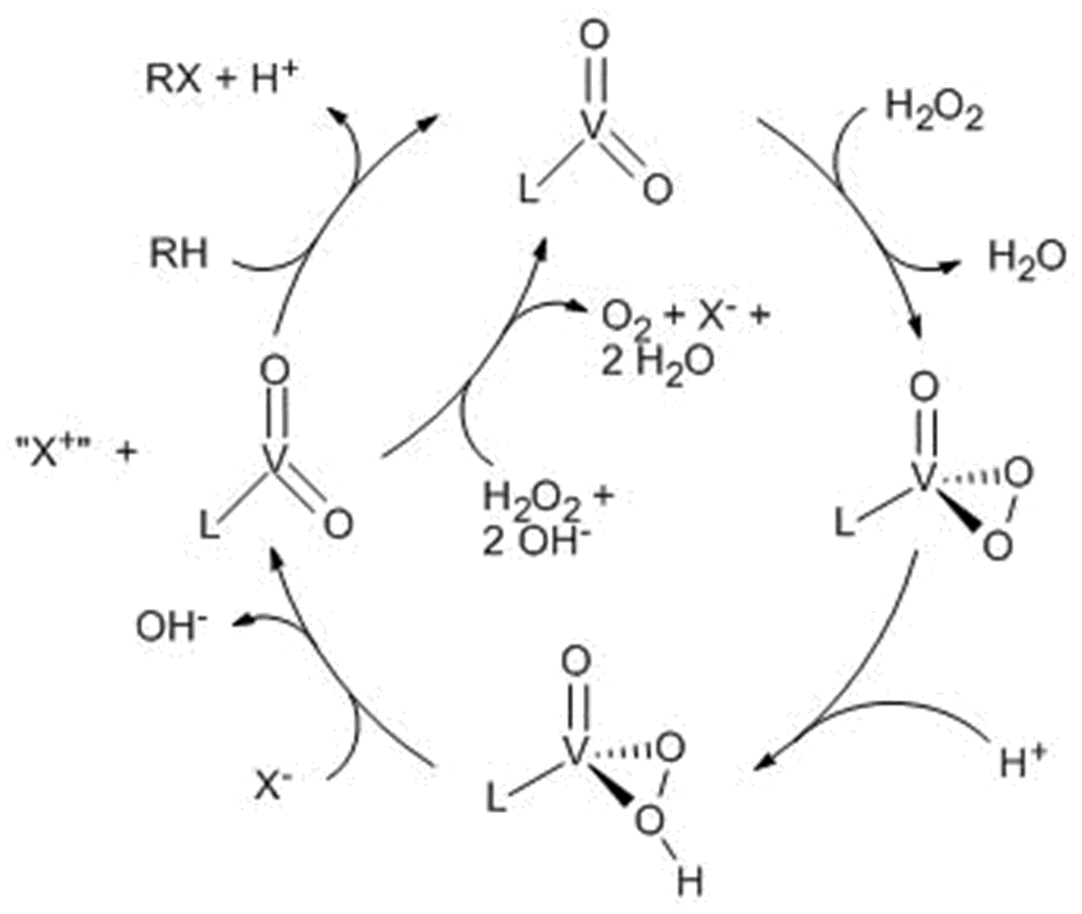
Proposed catalytic cycle for vanadium catalyzed production of organohalides

=== Metallopeptides ===
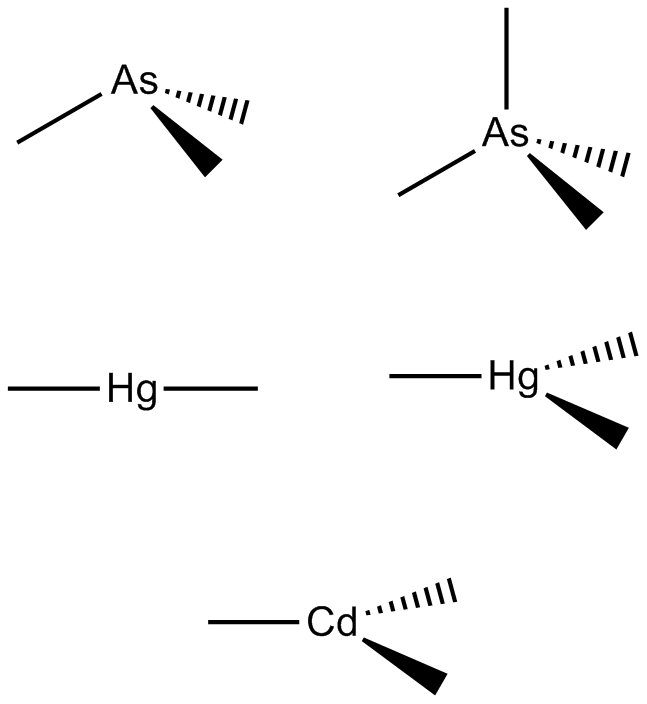
Observed binding geometries in peptides

The group also conducts research on the role of heavy metals in the body and how to alleviate their toxic effects. Heavy metals such as lead and mercury are toxic in the human body and can lead to life-threatening diseases such as Minamata disease. Unfortunately, the human body is essentially defenseless again these metals. The problem with mercury and lead is that they displace zinc in enzymes, thus leading to a halt in reactivity. They also strongly coordinate sulfur often leading to misfolding of proteins containing cysteines. Arsenic is also another metal of concern as it replaces nitrogen in DNA causing a deviation from its desired and necessary role. All of these metals, as well as many others have serious health consequences. Although humans have no way to deal with these heavy metals, bacteria have been found to developed ways to remove these metals to prevent toxic side effects. This information is what provides motivation for the Pecoraro group.

The initial studies have focused on understanding the binding of these heavy metals to peptides. Arsenic (As), mercury (Hg), and cadmium (Cd) all were used in systems with various peptides. Arsenic was found to bind to peptides via primarily a trigonal-pyramidal or tetrahedral shape in a manner that is both kinetically and thermodynamically favorable. Mercury on the other hand was found to bind to two sulfur atoms in separate peptides via a linear shape, thus causing the formation of a two strand coiled coil. It was also shown that under certain conditions, termed stepwise aggregation-deprotonation, mercury can be made to bind three sulfurs thus yielding a three strand coiled coil with an Hg in the middle. Cadmium was the last heavy metal studied in these systems. It was found that Cd also binds to three separate sulfurs, though it does not resemble the Hg system in that it does not form a linear binding shape within a two strand coiled coil. This information obtained gives valuable information on how these heavy metals interfere with proteins and their folding. This is the first step in understanding and potentially, solving heavy metal binding in the body.

=== De Novo-Designed Peptides ===
At least a third of all proteins contain at least one metal. A few examples of these proteins can be seen above (catalase and oxygen evolving complex). When considering the various roles that these metalloproteins play, ranging from hydrolytic bond cleavage to photosynthetic roles in plants, it is rather astounding how little is actually understood about the metal's role. In order to address this issue, the Pecoraro group has undertaken de novo or "from scratch" protein design. This methodology allows for a unique amino acid sequence, binding site of the metal, and finally, folding of the protein or respective metallopeptide. The Pecoraro group has specific interest in the placement of the binding site as they believe that changing the environment of the metal will ultimately cause a dramatic effect in all processes involving the metal such as catalytic activity, rate, and binding strength.

His group has created the first bimetallic artificial protein. This protein contains both a mercury, for stability, and zinc, for catalytic activity, and has been proven to perform various hydrolytic reactions of natural proteins. Where most synthetic compounds fail to perform similar to natural proteins, notably carbonic anhydrase, this artificial metalloprotein has excelled showing a similar proficiency to carbonic anhydrase, one of the fastest and highly catalytic proteins in the world.

== Honors ==
- Horace H. Rackham Foundation Fellow (1985)
- Eli Lilly Foundation Fellow (1985)
- G.D. Searle Biomedical Research Scholar (1986–1989)
- Alfred P. Sloan Fellow (1989–1990)
- LS&A Award for Excellence in Undergraduate Instruction (1991)
- ACS Akron Section Award for Excellence in Chemistry (1995)
- Frontier's Lecturer, Texas A & M University (1996)
- Mary Kapp Lecturer, Virginia Commonwealth University (1997)
- Karcher Lecturer, University of Oklahoma (1999)
- PittCon Lecturer, Duquesne University (2004)
- Alexander Von Humboldt Award for Senior US Scientists (1998–99)
- Chair, Metals in Biology Gordon Conference, (2000)
- Fellow, American Association for the Advancement of Science (2000)
- Margaret and Herman Sokol Faculty Award in the Sciences (2004–5)
- La Chaire Internationale des Recherche Blaise Pascal (2010–2012)
- Taiwan National Lecturer (2010)
- ACS Fellow (2010)
- Vanadis Award (2010)
