= Jan Crans =

Jan Crans or Cransse was a Flemish painter of historical subjects born in Antwerp in 1480. He was received into the Guild of St. Luke at Antwerp in 1528, and became dean thereof in 1535. Van Mander speaks highly of a picture by this master which was formerly in the cathedral of Antwerp, representing 'Christ washing the Feet of His Disciples'. Two panels of coats of arms by Crans, one of the Chamber of Rhetoric of Diest, and the other of that of Turnhout, are in the Antwerp Gallery.
