= Trace metal =

Metals subset of trace elements

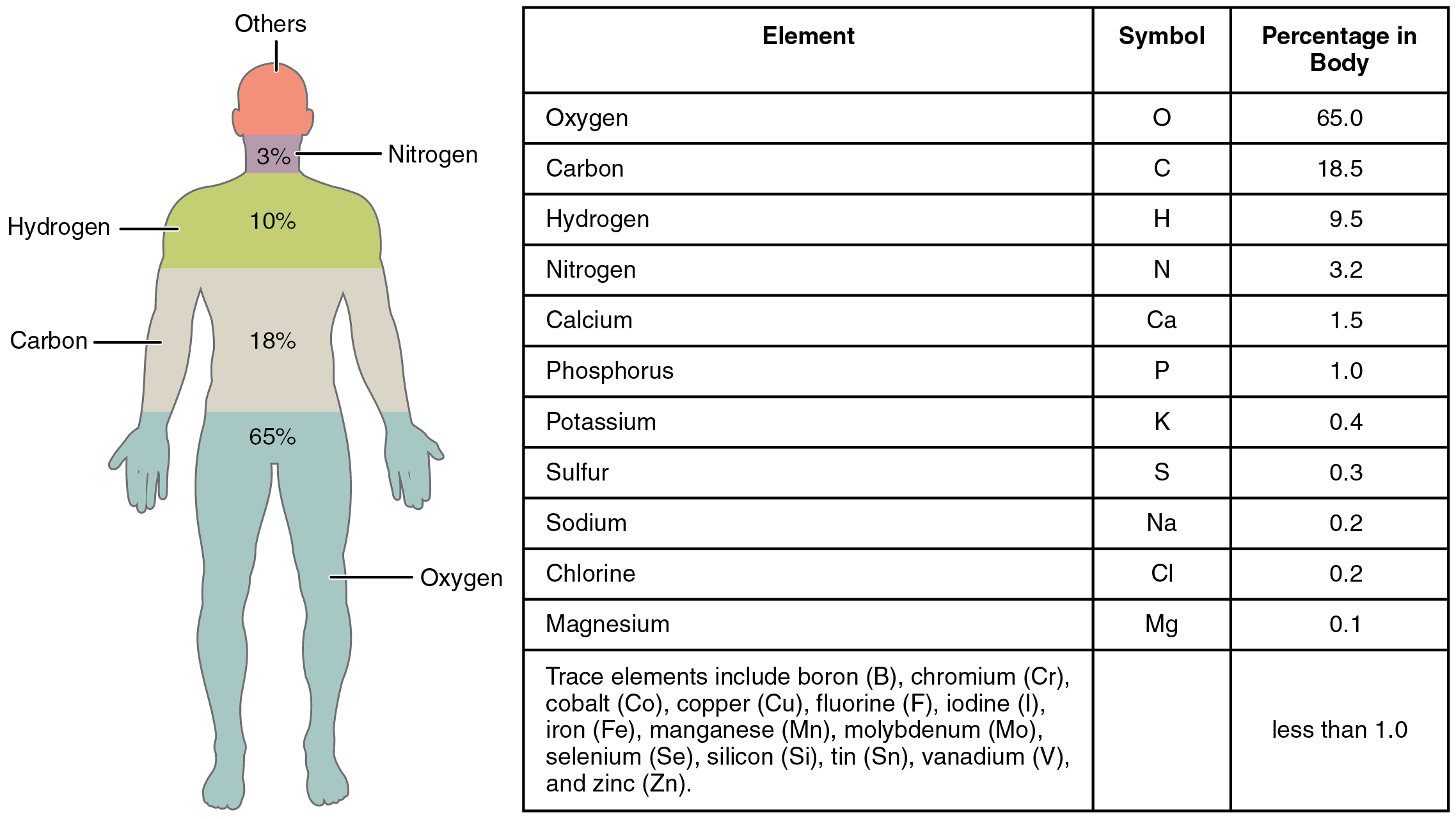
Element percentages in the human body.

Trace metals are the metals subset of trace elements; that is, metals normally present in small but measurable amounts in animal and plant cells and tissues. Some of these trace metals are a necessary part of nutrition and physiology. Some biometals are trace metals. Ingestion of, or exposure to, excessive quantities can be toxic. However, insufficient plasma or tissue levels of certain trace metals can cause pathology, as is the case with iron.

Trace metals within the human body include iron, lithium, zinc, copper, chromium, nickel, cobalt, vanadium, molybdenum, manganese and others.

Some of the trace metals are needed by living organisms to function properly and are depleted through the expenditure of energy by various metabolic processes of living organisms. They are replenished in animals through diet as well as environmental exposure, and in plants through the uptake of nutrients from the soil in which the plant grows. Human vitamin pills and plant fertilizers can be a source of trace metals.

Trace metals are sometimes referred to as trace elements, although the latter includes minerals and is a broader category. See also Dietary mineral. Trace elements are required by the body for specific functions. Things such as vitamins, sports drinks, fresh fruits and vegetables are sources. Taken in excessive amounts, trace elements can cause problems. For example, fluorine is required for the formation of bones and enamel on teeth. However, when taken in an excessive amount can cause a disease called "Fluorosis', in which bone deformations and yellowing of teeth are seen. Fluorine can occur naturally in some areas in ground water.

== Iron ==
=== Humans ===
Roughly 5 grams of iron are present in the human body and is the most abundant trace metal. It is absorbed in the intestine as heme or non-heme iron depending on the food source. Heme iron is derived from the digestion of hemoproteins in meat. Non-heme iron is mainly derived from plants and exist as iron(II) or iron(III) ions.

Iron is essential for more than 500 hemeproteins, the likes of which include hemoglobin and myoglobin, and account for 80% of iron usage. The other 20% is present in ferritin, hemosiderin, iron-sulfur (Fe/S) proteins, such as ferrochelatase, and more.

== Zinc ==
=== Humans ===
A relatively non-toxic metal to humans and the second most abundant, the body has 2-3 grams of zinc. It can enter the body through inhalation, skin absorption, and ingestion, with the latter of the bunch being the most common. The mucosal cells of the digestive tract contain metallothionein proteins that store the zinc ions.

Nearly 90% of zinc is found in the bones, muscles, and vesicles in the brain. Zinc is a cofactor in hundreds of enzyme reactions and a major component of zinc finger proteins.

== Copper ==
=== Humans ===
The third most abundant trace metal in the human body.

It is found in cytochrome c oxidase, a protein necessary for the electron transport chain in mitochondria.
