= Evolution of metal ions in biological systems =

Evolution of metal ions in biological systems refers to the incorporation of metallic ions into living organisms and how it has changed over time. Metal ions have been associated with biological systems for billions of years, but only in the last century have scientists began to truly appreciate the scale of their influence. Major (iron, copper, manganese, magnesium, calcium, and zinc) and minor (cobalt, nickel, molybdenum, tungsten, vanadium, and early lanthanides) metal ions have become aligned with living organisms through the interplay of biogeochemical weathering and metabolic pathways involving the products of that weathering. The associated complexes have evolved over time.

Natural development of chemicals and elements challenged organisms to adapt or die. Current organisms require redox reactions to induce metabolism and other life processes. Metals have a tendency to lose electrons and are important for redox reactions.

Metals have become so central to cellular function that the collection of metal-binding proteins (referred to as the metallomes) accounts for over 30% of all proteins in the cell. Metals are known to be involved in over 40% of enzymatic reactions, and metal-binding proteins carry out at least one step in almost all biological pathways.

Metals are also toxic so a balance must be acquired to regulate where the metals are in an organism as well as in what quantities. Many organisms have flexible systems in which they can exchange one metal for another if one is scarce. Metals in this discussion are naturally occurring elements that have a tendency to undergo oxidation. Vanadium, molybdenum, cobalt, copper, chromium, iron, manganese, nickel, and zinc are deemed essential because without them biological function is impaired.

== Origins ==
The Great Oxygenation Event. The upper red and lower green lines represent the range of the estimates.

The Earth began as an iron aquatic world with low oxygen. The Great Oxygenation Event occurred approximately 2.4 Ga (billion years ago) as cyanobacteria and photosynthetic life induced the presence of dioxygen in the planet's atmosphere. Iron became insoluble (as did other metals) and scarce while other metals became soluble. Sulfur was a very important element during this time. Once oxygen was released into the environment, sulfates made metals more soluble and released those metals into the environment; especially into the water. Incorporation of metals perhaps combatted oxidative stress.

The central chemistry of all these cells has to be reductive in order that the synthesis of the required chemicals, especially biopolymers, is possible. The different anaerobic, autocatalysed, reductive, metabolic pathways seen in the earliest known cells developed in separate energised vesicles, protocells, where they were produced cooperatively with certain bases of the nucleic acids.

Hypotheses proposed for how elements became essential is their relative quantity in the environment as life formed. This has produced research on the origin of life; for instance, Orgel and Crick hypothesized that life was extraterrestrial due to the alleged low abundance of molybdenum on early Earth (it is now suspected that there were larger quantities than previously thought). Another example is life forming around thermal vents based on the availability of zinc and sulfur. In conjunction with this theory is that life evolved as chemoautotrophs. Therefore, life occurred around metals and not in response to their presence. Some evidence for this theory is that inorganic matter has self-contained attributes that life adopted as shown by life's compartmentalization. Other evidence includes the ready binding of metals by artificial proteins without evolutionary history.

== Importance of metal ions in evolution ==
=== Catalysis ===
==== Redox catalysts ====
The prebiotic chemistry of life had to be reductive in order to obtain, e.g. Carbon monoxide (CO) and Hydrogen cyanide (HCN) from existing CO_{2} and N_{2} in the atmosphere. CO and HCN were precursor molecules of the essential biomolecules, proteins, lipids, nucleotides and sugars. However, atmospheric oxygen levels increased considerably, and it was then necessary for cells to have control over the reduction and oxidation of such small molecules in order to build and break down cells when necessary, without the inevitable oxidation (breaking down) of everything. Transition metal ions, due to their multiple oxidation states, were the only elements capable of controlling the oxidation states of such molecules, and thus were selected for.

==== Condensation and hydrolysis ====
O-donors such as HPO^{2−}_{4} were abundant in the prebiotic atmosphere. Metal ion binding to such O-donors was required to build the biological polymers, since the bond is generally weak, it can catalyze the required reaction and dissociate after (i.e. Mg^{2+} in DNA synthesis).

== Abundance of metals in seawater ==
Element	Prebiotic conditions (M)	Aerobic conditions (M)
Mg^{2+}	~ 10^{−2}	~ 10^{−2}
Mn^{2+}	~ 10^{−6}	~ 10^{−8}
Fe	~ 10^{−7} [Fe(II)]	~ 10^{−19} [Fe(III)]
Co^{2+}	~ 10^{−9}	~ 10^{−9}
Ni^{2+}	< 10^{−9}	< 10^{−9}
Cu	< 10^{−20} (very low) [Cu(I)]	< 10^{−10} [Cu(II)]
Zn^{2+}	< 10^{−12} (very low)	~ 10^{−8}
Mo	~ 10^{−9} (MoS^{2−}_{4}, Mo(OH)_{6})	10^{−8} (MoO^{2−}_{4})
W	WS^{2−}_{4}	10^{−9} (WO^{2−}_{4})
H^{+}	low pH (5.5?)	pH 8.5
H_{2}S	10^{−2} (High)	low [SO^{2−}_{4} (10^{−2})]
O_{2}	< 10^{−6} atm	~ 10^{−1} atm (21%)

=== Prebiotic (anaerobic) conditions ===
Around 4 Ga, the acidic seawater contained high amounts of H_{2}S and thus created a reducing environment with a potential of around −0.2 V. So any element that had a large negative value with respect to the reduction potential of the environment was available in its free ionic form and can subsequently be incorporated into cells, i.e. Mg^{2+} has a reduction potential of −2.372 V and was available in its ionic form at that time.

=== Aerobic conditions ===
Around 2 Ga, an increase in atmospheric oxygen levels took place, causing an oxidation of H_{2}S in the surroundings and an increase in the pH of the sea water. The resulting environment had become more oxidizing and thus allowed the later incorporation of the heavier metals such as copper and zinc.

== Irving–Williams series ==
Another factor affecting the availability of metal ions was their solubilities with H_{2}S. Hydrogen sulfide was abundant in the early sea giving rise to H_{2}S in the prebiotic acidic conditions and HS^{−} in the neutral (pH = 7.0) conditions. In the series of metal sulfides, insolubility increases at neutral pH following the Irving–Williams series:

- Mn(II) < Fe(II) < Co(II) ≤ Ni(II) < Cu(II) > Zn(II)

So in high amounts of H_{2}S, which was the prebiotic condition, only Fe was most prominently available in its ionic form due to its low insolubility with sulfides. The increasing oxidation of H_{2}S into SO^{2−}_{4} leads to the later release of Co^{+2}, Ni^{+2}, Cu^{+2}, and Zn^{+2} since all of their sulfates are soluble.

== Metal ions ==
=== Magnesium ===
Magnesium is the eighth most abundant element on earth. It is the fourth most abundant element in vertebrates and the most abundant divalent cation within cells. The most available form of magnesium (Mg^{2+}) for living organisms can be found in the hydrosphere. The concentration of Mg^{2+} in seawater is around 55 mM. Mg^{2+} is readily available to cells during early evolution due to its high solubility in water. Other transition metals like calcium precipitate from aqueous solutions at much lower concentrations than the corresponding Mg^{2+} salts.

Since magnesium was readily available in early evolution, it can be found in every cell type living organism. Magnesium in anaerobic prokaryotes can be found in MgATP. Magnesium also has many functions in prokaryotes such as glycolysis, all kinases, NTP reaction, signalling, DNA/RNA structures and light capture. In aerobic eukaryotes, magnesium can be found in cytoplasm and chloroplasts. The reactions in these cell compartments are glycolysis, photophosphorylation and carbon assimilation.

ATP, the main source of energy in almost all living organisms, must bind with metal ions such as Mg^{2+} or Ca^{2+} to function. Examination of cells with limited magnesium supply has shown that a lack of magnesium can cause a decrease in ATP. Magnesium in ATP hydrolysis acts as a co-factor to stabilize the high negative charge transition state. MgATP can be found in both prokaryotes and eukaryotes cells. However, most of the ATP in cells is MgATP. Following the Irving–Williams series, magnesium has a higher binding constant than the Ca^{2+}. Therefore, the dominant ATP in living organisms is MgATP. A greater binding constant also gives magnesium the advantage as a better catalyst over other competing transition metals.

=== Manganese ===
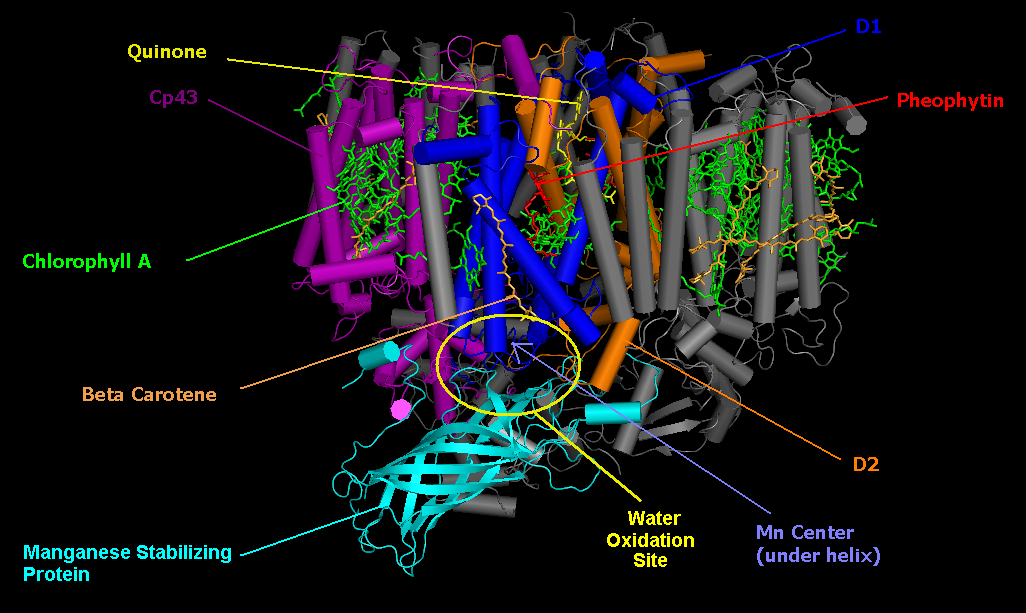
Magnesium Center in Cyanobacterial photosystem II. Incorporation of manganese sparked evolution of complex plant life.

Evidence suggests that manganese (Mn) was first incorporated into biological systems roughly 3.2–2.8 billion years ago, during the Archean Period. Together with calcium, it formed the manganese-calcium oxide complex (determined by X-ray diffraction) which consisted of a manganese cluster, essentially an inorganic cubane (cubical) structure. The incorporation of a manganese center in photosystem II was highly significant, as it allowed for photosynthetic oxygen evolution of plants. The oxygen-evolving complex (OEC) is a critical component of photosystem II contained in the thylakoid membranes of chloroplasts; it is responsible for terminal photosynthetic oxidation of water during light reactions.

The incorporation of Mn in proteins allowed the complexes the ability to reduce reactive oxygen species in Mn-superoxide dismutase (MnSOD) and catalase, in electron transfer-dependent catalysis (for instance in certain class I ribonucleotide reductases) and in the oxidation of water by photosystem II (PSII), where the production of thiobarbituric acid-reactive substances is decreased. This is due to manganese's ability to reduce superoxide anion and hydroxyl radicals as well as its chain-breaking capacity.

=== Iron ===
Iron (Fe) is the most abundant element in the Earth and the fourth most abundant element in the crust, approximately 5 percent by mass. Due to the abundance of iron and its role in biological systems, the transition and mineralogical stages of iron have played a key role in Earth surface systems. It played a larger role in the geological past in marine geochemistry, as evidenced by the deposits of Precambrian iron-rich sediments. The redox transformation of Fe(II) to Fe(III), or vice versa, is vital to a number of biological and element cycling processes. The reduction of Fe(III) is seen to oxidize sulfur (from H_{2}S to SO_{4}^{−2}), which is a central process in marine sediments. Many of the first metalloproteins consisted of iron-sulphur complexes formed during photosynthesis. Iron is the main redox metal in biological systems. In proteins, it is found in a variety of sites and cofactors, including, for instance, haem groups, Fe–O–Fe sites, and iron–sulfur clusters.

The prevalence of iron is apparently due to the large availability of Fe(II) in the initial evolution of living organisms, before the rise of photosynthesis and an increase in atmospheric oxygen levels which resulted in the precipitation of iron in the environment as Fe(OH)_{3}. It has flexible redox properties because such properties are sensitive to ligand coordination, including geometry. Iron can be also used in enzymes due to its Lewis acid properties, for example in nitrile hydratase. Iron is frequently found in mononuclear sites in the reduced Fe(II) form, and functions in dioxygen activation; this function is used as a major mechanism adopted by living organisms to avoid the kinetic barrier hindering the transformation of organic compounds by O_{2}. Iron can be taken up selectively as ferredoxins, Fe-O-Fe (hemerythrin and ribonucleotide reductase), Fe (many oxidases), apart from iron porphyrin. Variation in the related proteins with any one of these chemical forms of iron has produced a wide range of enzymes. All of these arrangements are modified to function both in the sense of reactivity and the positioning of the protein in the cell. Iron can have various redox and spin states, and it can be held in many stereochemistries.

Coenzyme F430 – Theorized as the first occurrence of nickel in biological systems

=== Nickel and cobalt ===
Coenzyme B12 – Theorized as the first occurrence of cobalt in a biological system

Around 4–3 Ga, anaerobic prokaryotes began developing metal and organic cofactors for light absorption. They ultimately ended up making chlorophyll from Mg(II), as is found in cyanobacteria and plants, leading to modern photosynthesis. However, chlorophyll synthesis requires numerous steps. The process starts with uroporphyrin, a primitive precursor to the porphyrin ring which may be biotic or abiotic in origin, which is then modified in cells differently to make Mg, Fe, nickel (Ni), and cobalt (Co) complexes. The centers of these rings are not selective, thus allowing the variety of metal ions to be incorporated. Mg porphyrin gives rise to chlorophyll, Fe porphyrin to heme proteins, Ni porphyrin yields factor F-430, and Co porphyrin Coenzyme B12.

=== Copper ===
Before the Great Oxygenation Event, copper was not readily available for living organisms. Most early copper was Cu^{+} and Cu. This oxidation state of copper is not very soluble in water. One billion years ago, after the great oxidation event the oxygen pressure rose sufficiently to oxidise Cu^{+} to Cu^{2+}, increasing its solubility in water. As a result, the copper became much more available for living organisms.

Most copper-containing proteins and enzymes can be found in eukaryotes. Only a handful of prokaryotes such as aerobic bacteria and cyanobacteria contain copper enzymes or proteins. Copper can be found in both prokaryotes and eukaryotes superoxide dismutase (SOD) enzyme. There are three distinct types of SOD, containing Mn, Fe and Cu respectively. Mn-SOD and Fe-SOD are found in most prokaryotes and mitochondria of the eukaryotic cell. Cu-SOD can be found in the cytoplasmic fraction of the eukaryotic cells. The three elements, copper, iron and manganese, can all catalyze superoxide to ordinary molecular oxygen or hydrogen peroxide. However, Cu-SOD is more efficient than Fe-SOD and Mn-SOD. Most prokaryotes only utilize Fe-SOD or Mn-SOD due to the lack of copper in the environment. Some organisms did not develop Cu-SOD due to the lack of a gene pool for the Cu-SOD adoption.

=== Zinc ===
Zinc (Zn) was incorporated into living cells in two waves. Four to three Ga, anaerobic prokaryotes arose, and the atmosphere was full of H_{2}S and highly reductive. Thus most zinc was in the form of insoluble ZnS. However, because seawater at the time was slightly acidic, some Zn(II) was available in its ionic form and became part of early anaerobic prokaryotes' external proteases, external nucleases, internal synthetases and dehydrogenases.

During the second wave, once the Great Oxygenation Event occurred, more Zn(II) ions were available in the seawater. This allowed its incorporation in the single-cell eukaryotes as they arose at this time. It is believed that the later addition of ions such as zinc and copper allowed them to displace iron and manganese from the enzyme superoxide dismutase (SOD). Fe and Mn complexes dissociate readily (Irving–Williams series) while Zn and Cu do not. This is why eukaryotic SOD contains Cu or Zn and its prokaryotic counterpart contains Fe or Mn.

Zn (II) doesn't pose an oxidation threat to the cytoplasm. This allowed it to become a major cytoplasmic element in the eukaryotes. It became associated with a new group of transcription proteins, zinc fingers. This could only have occurred due to the long life of eukaryotes, which allowed time for zinc to exchange and hence become an internal messenger coordinating the action of other transcription factors during growth.

=== Molybdenum ===
Molybdenum (Mo) is the most abundant transition element in solution in the sea (mostly as dianionic molybdate ion) and in living organisms, its abundance in the Earth's crust is quite low. Therefore, the use of Mo by living organisms seems surprising at first glance. Archaea, bacteria, fungi, plants, and animals, including humans, require molybdenum. It is also found in over 50 different enzymes. Its hydrolysis to water-soluble oxo-anionic species makes Mo readily accessible. Mo is found in the active sites of metalloenzymes that perform key transformations in the metabolism of carbon, nitrogen, arsenic, selenium, sulfur, and chlorine compounds. The mononuclear Mo enzymes are widely distributed in the biosphere; they catalyze many significant reactions in the metabolism of nitrogen and sulfur-containing compounds as well as various carbonyl compounds (e.g., aldehydes, CO, and CO_{2}). Nitrate reductases enzymes are important for the nitrogen cycle. They belong to a class of enzymes with a mononuclear Mo center and they catalyze the metabolism reaction of C, N, S, etc., in bacteria, plants, animals, and humans. Due to the oxidation of sulfides, The first considerable development was that of aerobic bacteria which could now utilize Mo. As oxygen began to accumulate in the atmosphere and oceans, the reaction of MoS_{2} to MoO_{4} also increased. This reaction made the highly soluble molybdate ion available for incorporation into critical metalloenzymes, and may have thus allowed life to thrive. It allowed organisms to occupy new ecological niches. Mo plays an important role in the reduction of dinitrogen to ammonia, which occurs in one type of nitrogenases. These enzymes are used by bacteria that usually live in a symbiotic relationship with plants; their role is nitrogen fixation, which is vital for sustaining life on earth. Mo enzymes also play important roles in sulfur metabolism of organisms ranging from bacteria to humans.

=== Tungsten ===
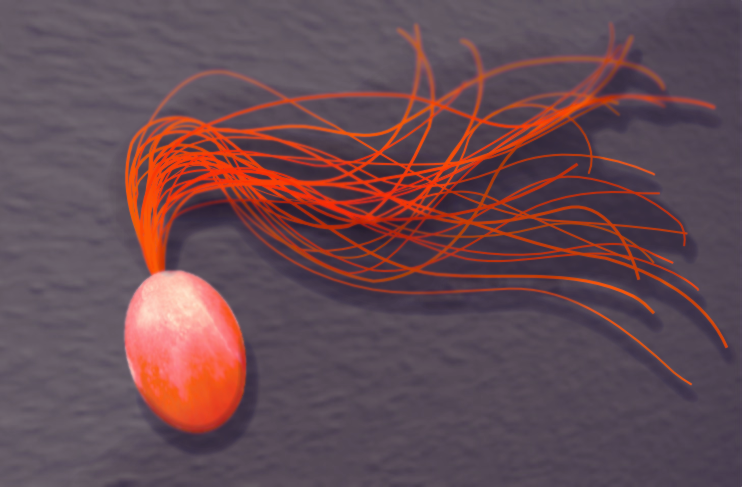
Pyrococcus furiosus, one of the few modern organisms in which the incorporation of tungsten is still essential

Tungsten is one of the oldest metal ions to be incorporated in biological systems, preceding the Great Oxygenation Event. Before the abundance of oxygen in Earth's atmosphere, oceans teemed with sulfur and tungsten, while molybdenum, a metal that is highly similar chemically, was inaccessible in solid form. The abundance of tungsten and lack of free molybdenum likely explains why early marine organisms incorporated the former instead of the latter. However, as cyanobacteria began to fill the atmosphere with oxygen, molybdenum became available (molybdenum becomes soluble when exposed to oxygen) and molybdenum began to replace tungsten in the majority of metabolic processes, which is seen today, as tungsten is only present in the biological complexes of prokaryotes (methanogens, gram-positive bacteria, gram-negative aerobes and anaerobes), and is only obligated in hyperthermophilic archaea such as P. furiosus.

Although research into the specific enzyme complexes in which tungsten is incorporated is relatively recent (1970s), natural tungstoenzymes are abundantly found in a large number of prokaryotic microorganisms. These include formate dehydrogenase, formyl methanofuran dehydrogenase, acetylene hydratase, and a class of phylogenetically related oxidoreductases that catalyze the reversible oxidation of aldehydes. The first crystal structure of a tungsten- or pterin-containing enzyme, that of aldehyde ferredoxin oxidoreductase from P. furiosus, has revealed a catalytic site with one W atom coordinated to two pterin molecules which are themselves bridged by a magnesium ion.

=== Calcium ===
Calcium (Ca) is the third most abundant metal in nature, and evidence has suggested that calcium ions were adopted by biological systems at an early evolutionary stage.

Calcium's chemical properties make it ideal for use by proteins involved in signalling. Specifically, Calcium has a uniquely high coordination number, which allows for diverse and responsive protein binding that is necessary for rapid on and off signalling cycles.
