= Coordination Chemistry Reviews =

- Discipline: coordination chemistry
- Language: English
- Edited by: P. A. Gale

Publication details
- History: 1966–present
- Publisher: Elsevier
- Frequency: Semimonthly
- Impact factor: 23.5 (2024)

Standard abbreviations
- ISO 4: Coord. Chem. Rev.

Indexing
- CODEN: CCHRAM
- ISSN: 0010-8545 (print); 1873-3840 (web)
- LCCN: 77015065
- OCLC no.: 01565057

Links
- Journal homepage; Online archive

Coordination Chemistry Reviews is a semimonthly peer-reviewed scientific journal published by Elsevier. It was established in 1966 and covers all aspects of coordination chemistry. The editor-in-chief is Philip A. Gale (University of Groningen). Coordination Chemistry Research, a sister journal aimed towards primary research rather than reviews, was launched in 2024.

== Abstracting and indexing ==
The journal is abstracted and indexed in Academic Search Premier, Chemical Abstracts Core, Science Citation Index Expanded and Scopus. According to the Journal Citation Reports, the journal has a 2025 impact factor of 23.5.
