= Hans Freeman =

Australian chemist (1929–2008)

Hans Freeman AM, FAA
- Born: Hans Charles Freeman; 26 May 1929; Breslau, Germany (now Wrocław, Poland)
- Died: 9 November 2008 (aged 79); Sydney, Australia
- Education: University of Sydney: BSc (Hons 1M), 1949; MSc, 1952; PhD, 1957
- Known for: Protein crystallography
- Spouse(s): Edith Freeman (née Siou), married 1966
- Children: 2
- Awards: AM; FAA; Burrows Award (1980); Leighton Memorial Medal (1999); Centenary Medal (2001); RACI Distinguished Fellowship (2007); Craig Medal (2007)
- Scientific career
- Fields: Inorganic chemistry, Biochemistry
- Workplaces: University of Sydney (1954–2008): Professor of Inorganic Chemistry (1971–1997); Emeritus Professor of Inorganic Chemistry (1997–2008)

Hans Charles Freeman AM, FAA (26 May 1929 – 9 November 2008) was a German-born Australian bioinorganic chemist, protein crystallographer, and professor of inorganic chemistry who spent most of his academic career at the University of Sydney. His best known contributions to chemistry were his work explaining the unusual structural, electrochemical, and spectroscopic properties of blue copper proteins, particularly plastocyanin. He also introduced protein crystallography to Australia and was a strong advocate for courses to ensure Australian scientists have good access to "big science" facilities. Freeman has received numerous honours, including being elected a Fellow of the Australian Academy of Science (FAA) and appointed a Member of the Order of Australia (AM) by the Australian Government. He was a charismatic lecturer who voluntarily continued teaching well into his formal retirement and imbued his students with a love of science.

== Early years and education ==
Hans Charles Freeman was the first and only son of Karl and Lotte Freeman and was born in Breslau in Germany in 1929 (now Wrocław, Poland). In 1938, following a tip-off from a Nazi party member, Karl decided to relocate his Jewish family to Australia. Karl brought his knowledge of detergents (a novelty in Australia at the time) to his new homeland, applying it to the problem of cleaning blood-stained blankets that would otherwise be wasted. After the war, he founded K. H. Freeman Pty Ltd, a detergent and soap manufacturing company; Hans spent many weekends working in the factory, gaining a practical insight into chemistry.

Hans adapted well to his new environment, quickly mastering his new language and demonstrating his outstanding scholastic ability. He was dux of his primary school, dux of Sydney Boys High in 1945, and took his bachelor's degree with the university medal in chemistry in 1949. He was one of the ten chemistry students in his class at Sydney Boys High to go on to become Professors of Chemistry. After receiving his MSc in 1952 under the supervision of Raymond Le Fèvre FRS, Freeman attended Caltech on a Rotary Foundation Fellowship where, at the urging of Linus Pauling, he learned the fundamentals of crystallography. He received a PhD in 1957 for his work on the structure of biuret hydrate, where he completed most of the calculations for the crystal structure by hand.

== Personal life ==
Freeman came to Australia with his parents and his sister, Eva. Following the death of his father in 1958, he became a Director of K. H. Freeman Pty Ltd, which continues to operate today. He met Edith Siou in 1964 and they married in 1966. They have two children, Maeva and Philip.

== Career ==
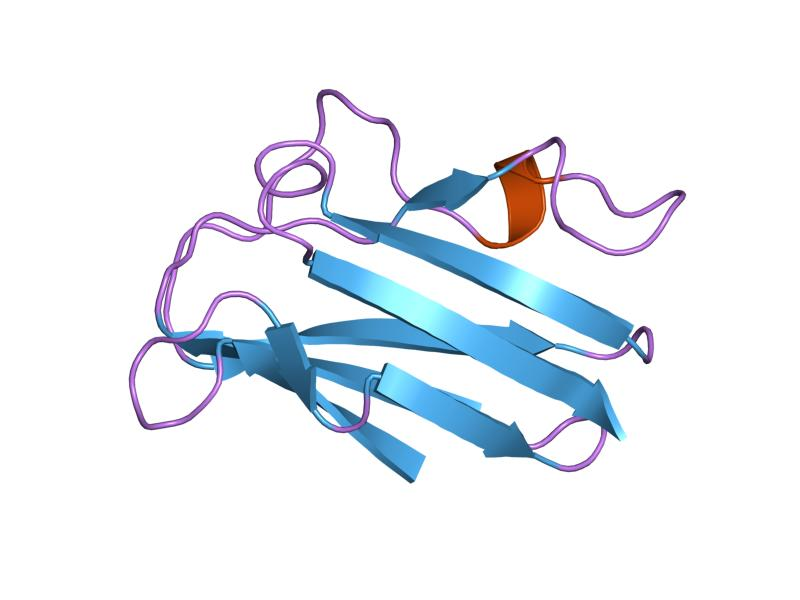
Structure of poplar plastocyanin

Freeman was appointed to the faculty of the University of Sydney in 1954 as a Lecturer, working his way up until he was made the inaugural Professor of Inorganic Chemistry in 1971. Freeman pioneered the use of computers in crystallography in Australia, working on SILLIAC (the Australian cousin of the University of Illinois' ILLIAC machine and Australia's second computer) after its installation in 1956. His research group extended its interests beyond purely organic compounds and on to metal complexes (such as copper biuret, one of the first bioinorganic substances to be structurally determined) and went on to determine the structures of numerous metal complexes of amino acids and peptides.

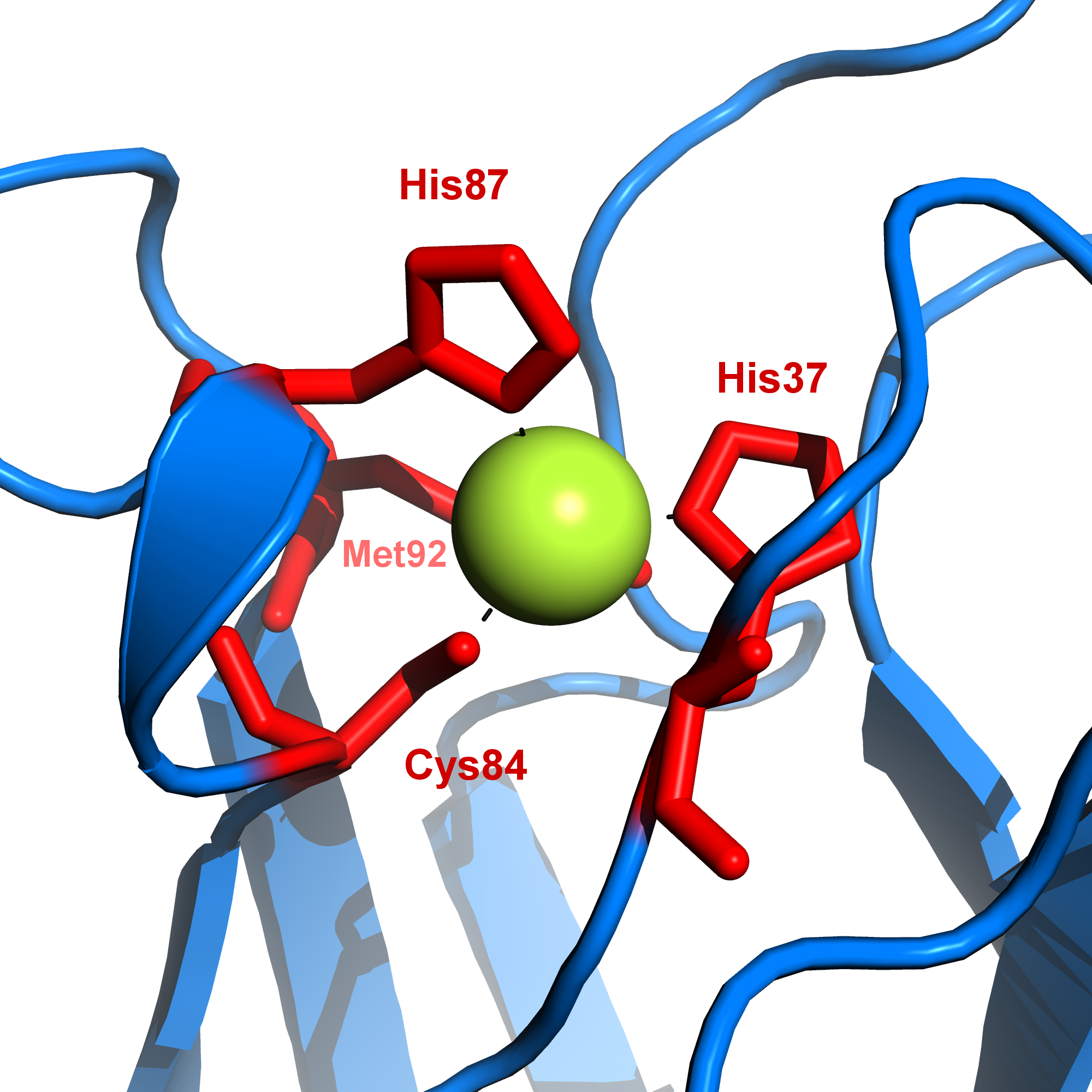
The copper site in plastocyanin, with the four amino acids that bind the metal labelled

In 1970, the focus of Freeman's research became protein crystallography and he turned his attention to the blue copper proteins (cupredoxins) and particularly the electron transport protein plastocyanin. The intensely blue colour of plastocyanin and its unusual redox properties had frustrated all attempts to synthesise a small molecule mimic. It was not until 1977 that his group finally determined the structure of plastocyanin crystallised from the poplar tree (see diagram at right); this was the first protein crystal structure determined in the Southern Hemisphere. Together with subsequent work in collaboration with Ed Solomon, this work led to understanding of the unusual geometry of the copper metal site (see diagram at left) as well as the spectroscopic and electrochemical properties characteristic of blue copper proteins.

Later in his career, Freeman developed an interest in the applications of EXAFS spectroscopy to metalloprotein structure, collaborating with both James Penner-Hahn and Keith Hodgson. Working together, the Freeman and Hodgson groups were, in 1988, the first to determine a new crystal structure of a protein using the multiple wavelength anomalous dispersion (MAD) method.

Throughout his career, Freeman was concerned about the influence of the tyranny of distance on the development of Australian science. For this reason, in 1972 Freeman and Alexander Boden AO, FAA, founded the Foundation for Inorganic Chemistry at the university to bring international scholars to the department to deliver a course for graduate students and give seminars for faculty. The inaugural Foundation scholar was nobel laureate Linus Pauling and the Foundation has brought many other eminent research chemists to Australia. The Foundation has thus functioned to increase Australian awareness of state of the art international research, increased international recognition of Australian research, and allowed graduate students to interact with leading chemists based in institutions far from Australia. Many of the students have gone on to post-graduate or post-doctoral positions with a Foundation scholar.

Freeman also provided advice to the Australian Government on the problem of access to "big science" facilities. This included making major contributions to the report Small Country - Big Science in his work for the Australian Science and Technology Council. The report emphasised the need for Australian researchers to have access to facilities such as synchrotron X-ray and high intensity neutron sources, and led directly to the formation of the Australian Synchrotron Research Programme (ASRP) to fund access to such facilities. Freeman served as a board member of the ASRP until its functions were subsumed under the newly commissioned Australian Synchrotron in 2008. The Australian expertise developed as a consequence of ASRP-supported research led to the Australian Synchrotron being built a decade sooner than would have otherwise been the case.

Freeman retired from his Chair in 1997, and was succeeded by Len Lindoy FAA. Nevertheless, he continued working in research and became Emeritus Professor of Chemistry and Emeritus Professor of Molecular and Microbial Biosciences. He also voluntarily continued teaching at first-year level. His lecturing was described as "charismatic" and "teaching was a love and a privilege and never an obligation" for him.

== Legacy ==
Freeman was principally responsible for the establishment of structural biology as a discipline in Australia. He founded the first protein crystallography laboratory in Australia; by the time of his death, there were at least 15 active research groups carrying out protein crystallography in Australia and New Zealand. Many former members of the Freeman research group have moved on to join one of these other groups. The groups interact through the Society of Crystallographers of Australia and New Zealand (SCANZ); Freeman was instrumental in forming the organisation (then called the Society of Crystallographers of Australia) in 1976, and was its Foundation President. Working as a crystallographer, Freeman's major legacies are the understanding of plastocyanin and other blue copper proteins, and development of the MAD method as an extension of EXAFS spectroscopy. Freeman's work in ensuring Australian scientists have access to "big science" facilities will continue to assist researchers into the future. His teaching also leaves a legacy of "generations of students imbued with a love of science".

== Honours and awards ==
Freeman was recognised for his professional achievements with Fellowships in the Royal Australian Chemical Institute (RACI) in 1968, the Royal Society of Chemistry in 1984, and the Australian Academy of Science in 1984. Freeman's contributions were also recognised by the Australian Government with a Centenary Medal in 2001 for "service to Australian society and science in chemistry" and with his appointment as a Member of the Order of Australia in June 2005 for "service to science and scientific research in the field of bio-inorganic chemistry, particularly through the establishment and development of the discipline of crystallography in Australia".

Freeman received numerous awards over his long career. In 1980, Freeman received the Burrows Award, the premier award of the Inorganic Chemistry Division of the RACI. He was also awarded the 1999 Leighton Memorial Medal which is "the RACI's most prestigious medal and is awarded in recognition of eminent services to chemistry in Australia in the broadest sense." In 2007, he received both the Australian Academy of Science's Craig Medal and an RACI Distinguished Fellowship.

== Most cited publications ==
The number of citations indicated for each of the following papers are from Web of Science data as at 22 June 2013:

- X-Ray crystal-structure analysis of plastocyanin at 2.7 Å resolution --- 707 citations
- Guss, J. M.; Freeman, H. C. (1983). "Structure of oxidised poplar plastocyanin at 1.6 Å resolution". J. Mol. Biol. 169 (2): 521–563. doi:10.1016/S0022-2836(83)80064-3. PMID 6620385. --- 642 citations
- Guss, J. M.; Harrowell, P. R.; Murata, M.; Norris, V. A.; Freeman, H. C. (1986). "Crystal structure analyses of reduced (Cu^{I}) poplar plastocyanin at 6 pH values". J. Mol. Biol. 192 (2): 361–387. doi:10.1016/0022-2836(86)90371-2. PMID 3560221. --- 388 citations
- Guss, J. M.; Bartunik, H. D.; Freeman, H. C. (1992). "Accuracy and precision in protein-structure analysis: restrained least-squares refinement of the structure of poplar plastocyanin at 1.33 Å resolution". Acta Crystallogr. B. 48 (6): 790–811. Bibcode:1992AcCrB..48..790G. doi:10.1107/S0108768192004270. PMID 1492962. --- 257 citations
- Kumar, V.; Dooley, D. M.; Freeman, H. C.; Guss, J. M.; Harvey, I.; McGuirl, M. A.; Wilce, M. C. J.; Zubak, V. M. (1996). "Crystal structure of a eukaryotic (pea seedling) copper-containing amine oxidase at 2.2 Å resolution". Structure. 4 (8): 943–955. doi:10.1016/S0969-2126(96)00101-3. PMID 8805580. --- 209 citations
