= David Garner (chemist) =

British chemist

Dave Garner FRSC, FRS
- Born: Christopher David Garner; 9 November 1941 (age 84)
- Scientific career
- Education: University of Nottingham
- Awards: FRS (1997); FRSC
- Fields: Biological Inorganic Chemistry
- Workplaces: University of Manchester; Caltech; University of Nottingham
- Thesis: Crystal structures of Group IV metal nitrates (1966)
- Doctoral advisor: Clive Addison
- Doctoral students: James Naismith
- Garner's voice recorded in 2014

Christopher David Garner FRSC FRS (born 9 November 1941) is a British retired chemist, whose research work was in the growing field of Biological Inorganic Chemistry. His research primarily focussed on the role of transition metal elements in biological processes, for which he published over 400 original papers and reviews on the topic. His specific interests lie in the roles of Molybdenum and Tungsten as the metal centres in various enzyme cofactors based on the molybdopterin molecule.

As well as his research work, Garner has also been a member of the Royal Society of Chemistry, for which he has been a member of the council for many years and served as president from 2008 to 2010.

== Academic career ==
Garner was educated at Cheadle Hulme Warehousemen & Clerk's Orphans' School and studied for his undergraduate degree at the University of Nottingham, graduating with a Bachelor of Science degree with First Class Honours in 1963. Under the supervision of Clive Addison subsequently earned his PhD for his work on the "Crystal structures of Group IV metal nitrates" in 1966.

== Career ==
Following his graduation, Garner took up a post-doctoral research fellowship at the California Institute of Technology for one year, before returning to the UK to take up a post as the ICI Research Fellow at the University of Nottingham. He was then subsequently appointed as a lecturer in chemistry at the University of Manchester in 1968, and rose through the ranks to senior lecturer (1978), and finally appointed Professor of Inorganic Chemistry in 1984. Garner was appointed as the Head of the School of Chemistry from 1988 to 1996, and served as a member of the University Court from 1995 to 1999, and as a member of the University Council from 1996 to 1999.

In 1998, Garner took up the post of Professor of Biological Inorganic Chemistry at the University of Nottingham, a post which he held until his retirement in 2010. As such he now holds the post of professor emeritus. From 2011 to 2017 he served as Editor for the Royal Society journal, Philosophical Transactions of the Royal Society A.

Garner has also held the following posts in various establishments around the world:

- Visiting Professor – University of Louisiana (1977)
- Frontiers in Chemical Research Visiting Professor – Texas A&M University (1987)
- Visiting Professor – Strasbourg University (1990–1992)
- Visiting Professor – University of Florence (1995)
- Visiting Professor – University of Arizona (1998)
- Visiting Professor – Sydney University (2000)
- Wilsmore Fellow – University of Melbourne (1994)
- Bye Fellow and Fellow – Robinson College, Cambridge (1997)
- Chairperson of the Chemistry of Metal Ions in Biological Systems (METBIO) programme – European Science Foundation (1991–1997)

Discussion held during the METBIO programme resulted in the creation of the Society of Biological Inorganic Chemistry, for which Garner was the founding president from 1996 to 1998, and also the creation of its official journal, the Journal of Biological Inorganic Chemistry.

== Awards and honours ==
Garner has received numerous awards and honours including:

- Tilden Medal and Lectureship (1985)
- Fellowship of the Royal Society (1997)
- Entered into Who's Who (1998)
- Joseph Chatt Lectureship (1999)
- Inorganic Biochemstry Award (2002)
- Ludwig Mond Lectureship (2007)

His nomination for the Royal Society reads:

Distinguished for his development of the coordination chemistry of the transition elements, leading to an improved understanding of their role in biological systems. Early work made notable contributions to the synthesis and crystallographic characterization of metal nitrate complexes, and to the structural classification of the numerous modes of coordination of the nitrato ligand. This was extended to a study of the role of the molybdenum centre in the nitrate reductase enzymes, and to a pioneering work on the use of EXAFS at Daresbury to probe the chemical distinction between active and desulpho xanthine oxidase. Elegant syntheses afforded the first examples of complexes containing Fe3MoS4 and Fe3WS4 cubane-like cores. Subsequently, X-ray Absorption Spectroscopy (XAS) of the Fe/Mo and Fe/V cofactors resulted in the first structural characterization for a vanadium site in an enzyme. Imaginative work on Cu-Mo-S and Cu-V-S clusters, and on the copper and zinc sites in reduced bovine superoxide dismutase have provided further important insights. Garner was awarded the Tilden Lectureship in 1985 and is the author or coauthor of some 240 papers.

=== Royal Society of Chemistry ===
Garner has been an active member of the Royal Society of Chemistry for many years, having obtained his Chartered Chemist (CChem) status in 1982, and being appointed as a Fellow of the Royal Society of Chemistry in the same year. Garner has also held the following roles within the RSC:

- President of the Dalton Division (2001–2004)
- Member of the Council (2005–Present)
- President of the RSC (2008–2010)

Garner is also an Honorary Fellow of the Chinese Chemical Society.

== Personal life ==
Garner was born to Chrystabel and Richard Norman Garner in 1941. Garner has two children Joseph and Katy with his wife, Pamela, whom he met at the University of Nottingham.
