= Högbom =

Högbom is a Swedish surname. Notable people with the name include:

- Arvid Högbom (1857–1940), Swedish geologist
- Jan Högbom (born 1929), Swedish astronomer and university professor
- Jens Högbom (born 1995), Swedish ice hockey player
- Martin Högbom (born 1974), Swedish biochemist and structural biologist

== See also ==
- Högbom Outcrops – Landform in Antarctica
