= Maria Arménia Carrondo =

Portuguese chemical engineer specialising in crystallography

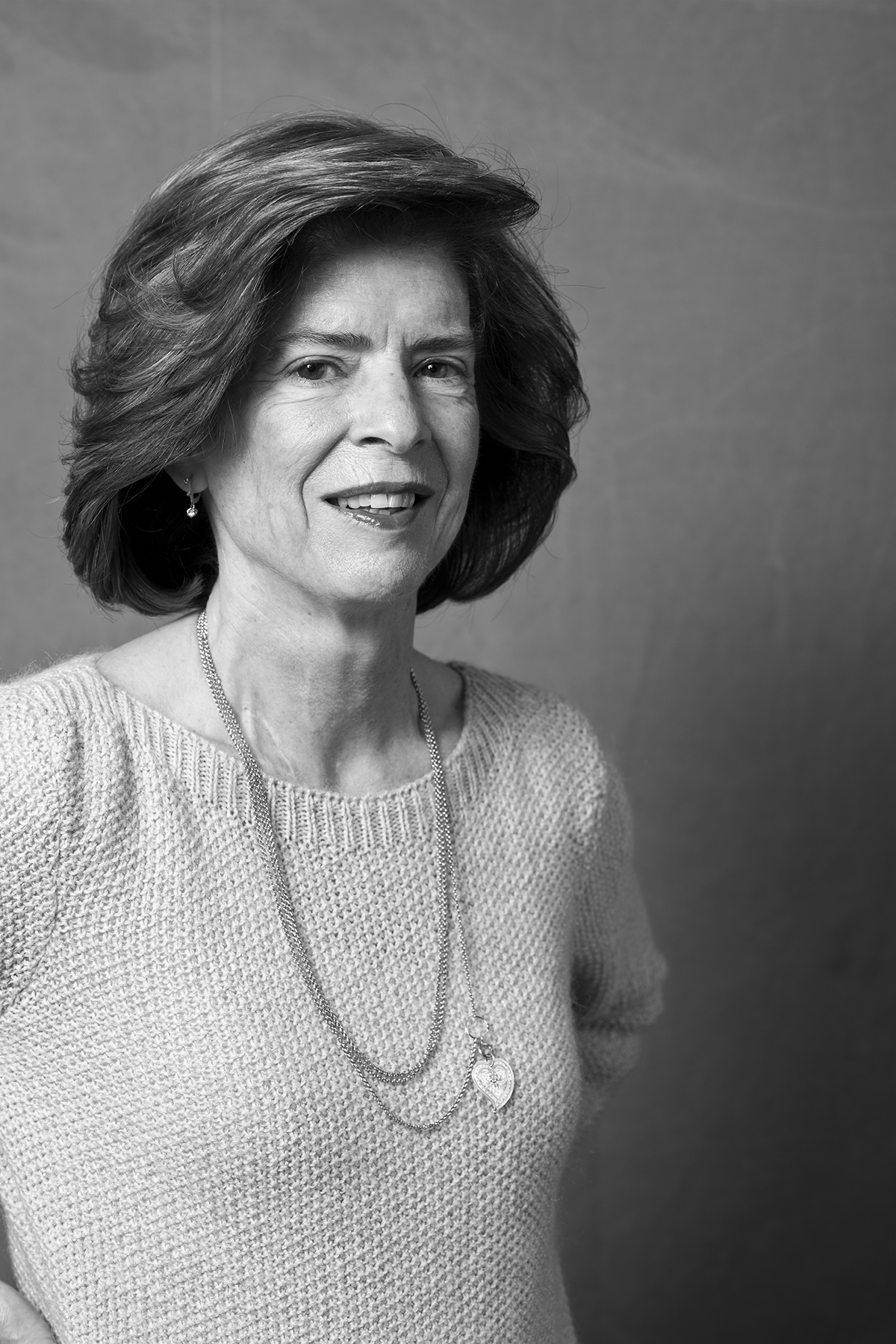
- Born: 31 July 1948 (age 78); Vila Nova de Famalicão, Portugal
- Known for: Work on crystallography

Maria Arménia Carrondo (born 1948) is a Portuguese scientist specialized in protein crystallography. She was a full professor at the Institute of Chemical and Biological Technology (ITQB) of the NOVA University Lisbon and former president of the Foundation for Science and Technology (FCT), the main funding institution for science in Portugal.

== Early life and training ==
Maria Arménia Abreu Fonseca Carvalho Teixeira Carrondo was born on 31 July 1948 in Vila Nova de Famalicão in the north of Portugal. After graduating in chemical engineering at the University of Porto in 1971, she studied chemical crystallography at Imperial College London, obtaining a doctorate in 1978.

== Academic career ==
The year after obtaining her doctorate, Carrondo took up a position as assistant professor at the Instituto Superior Técnico of the University of Lisbon, a position she held until 1998. There she created and directed a research group on crystallography of organic, inorganic and organometallic molecules. In 1989, she participated in the foundation of the Institute of Chemical and Biological Technology (ITQB), based in Oeiras, as part of the NOVA University, where she became a full professor in 1998. In 1996 she was appointed as ITQB's deputy director, a position she held until 2005. Between 2007 and 2013, she was vice-chancellor of the NOVA University. In her career she has supervised 30 postgraduate students.

Carrondo's research work has focused on bioinorganic chemistry and the study of proteins using the X-ray crystallography technique. She is the coordinator of activities in this area at ITQB, where she also directs the structural genomics laboratory. She has studied molecules of interest to medicine, namely proteins related to the immune system, and differentiated various structures of metalloproteins and metalloenzymes. Much of her research work requires the use of synchrotron radiation to study the structure of proteins. In order to facilitate access for Portuguese scientists, she coordinated Portugal's accession process to the European Synchrotron Radiation Facility (ESRF) in Grenoble and represented Portugal on the Board of the ESRF from 1998 to 2002. She was a member of the ESRF Science Advisory Committee between 2012 and 2015. Since 2012 she has been a member of the Proposal Review Committee of the Swiss Light Source Synchrotron and a member of several other similar advisory boards, including the European Research Council and the Academy of Finland. She was vice-president of the Portuguese Biochemical Society from 1998 to 2004. She edited the Journal of Biological Inorganic Chemistry between 2001 and 2015.

In April 2015 Carrondo was appointed President of the Fundação para a Ciência e a Tecnologia (Foundation for Science and Technology - FCT), a public entity under the supervision of the Ministry of Education and Science, that decides on research funding. A political appointment, she left the position in January 2016. She had also been an advisor to the board of directors of FCT under the previous presidency of Miguel Seabra. When he resigned in 2015, Carrondo was named president.

== Awards and honours ==
Awards and honours received by Carrondo include:

- Carrondo received the 2004 EuroBIC Medal, awarded by the European Congress on Bioorganic Chemistry in recognition of her contributions to this scientific area.
- In 2004, she received an award for the best article on biophysics published in 2003, from the Sociedade Portuguesa de Biofísica.
- Both her home municipality, Vila Nova de Famalicão, and the municipality where she works, Oeiras, headquarters of the ITQB, have awarded her a Municipal Medal of Honour.
- In 2008 she received the Câmara Pestana Prize, jointly awarded by the Instituto Bacteriológico de Câmara Pestana and GlaxoSmithKline of Portugal for research work on RNA published in the journal, Nature, in 2006.
- Carrondo was one of twenty Portuguese women scientists photographed by Luísa Ferreira for an exhibition on Women in Science, which took place in March 2015 in Lisbon.

== Publications ==
Largely as co-author, Carrondo has published more than 160 articles in refereed journals.
