= Frank Neese =

German theoretical chemist (born 1967)

- Born: 13 December 1967 (age 58); Wiesbaden, Germany
- Education: University of Konstanz
- Scientific career
- Fields: Theoretical Chemistry, Quantum Chemistry, Spectroscopy
- Workplaces: Max Planck Institute for Coal Research University of Bonn; Max Planck Institute for Chemical Energy Conversion University of Duisburg-Essen
- Doctoral advisor: Peter M. Kroneck
- Other academic advisors: Edward I. Solomon
- Website: www.kofo.mpg.de/en/research/molecular-theory-and-spectroscopy

Frank Günther Neese is a German theoretical chemist at the Max Planck Institute for Coal Research. He is the author of more than 440 scientific articles in journals of Chemistry, Biochemistry and Physics. His work focuses on the theory of magnetic spectroscopies (electron paramagnetic resonance, magnetic circular dichroism) and their experimental and theoretical application, local pair natural orbital correlation theories, spectroscopy oriented configuration interaction, electronic and geometric structure and reactivity of transition metal complexes and metalloenzymes. He is lead author of the ORCA quantum chemistry computer program. His methods have been applied to a range of problems in coordination chemistry, homogeneous catalysis, and bioinorganic chemistry.

== Early life and career ==
Neese was born on 13 December 1967 in Wiesbaden. He received both his Diploma (Biology – 1993) and Ph.D (1997) working with Peter M. Kroneck at the University of Konstanz. Neese performed postdoctoral work at Stanford University with Edward I. Solomon from 1997 to 1999, then returned to Konstanz where he completed his habilitation in 2001.

== Independent career ==
He joined the Max Planck Institute (MPI) for Bioinorganic Chemistry in 2001 as a group leader, where he directed a research group until accepting the position of full Professor and Chair of Theoretical Chemistry at the University of Bonn in 2006. In 2008, Neese returned part time to the MPI as one of its rare "Max Planck Fellows" within the Department of Inorganic Chemistry. In 2011, he became Director of the MPI for Bioinorganic Chemistry, renamed in 2012 in MPI for Chemical Energy Conversion, where he heads the department of Molecular Theory and Spectroscopy. In 2018 he moved to Mülheim's other Max Planck Institute, Max Planck Institute for Coal Research.

== Personal life ==
He is married to Serena DeBeer, a spectroscopist who is a director of the Max Planck Institute for Chemical Energy Conversion.

== Awards ==
In 2005, Neese received the Hellmann Award of the German Theoretical Chemical Society for the Development and Application of new Theoretical Methods and subsequently the Klung-Wilhelmy Weberbank Award in 2008 and the Gottfried Wilhelm Leibniz Prize of the German Research Foundation (DFG) in 2010. In 2013, he was inducted into the German National Academy of Sciences Leopoldina. He was Associate Editor (2011–2014) of the journal PhysChemChemPhys and is a Member of the International Academy of Quantum Molecular Sciences (IAQMS, since 2012). Since 2015 Frank Neese has served as an Associate Editor of the journal Inorganic Chemistry and as of 2016 he is Member of the Editorial Board of the review book series Structure and Bonding. As of 2016 Neese has been appointed as an active member of the International Advisory Board for the Institute of Organic Chemistry and Biochemistry (IOCB) of the Czech Academy of Sciences in Prague and he was elected as a new Member of the Review Board "Physical and Theoretical Chemistry" in the field of "General Theoretical Chemistry" of the DFG.
