= Angela Casini =

Medicinal and inorganic chemist

- Education: University of Florence
- Awards: European Medal for Bio-Inorganic Chemistry
- Scientific career
- Workplaces: Technical University of Munich; University of Groningen

Angela Casini is a medicinal and inorganic chemist who works on metal-based compounds as therapeutic agents. She was awarded the 2012 European Medal for Bio-Inorganic Chemistry and made the 2019 American Chemical Society Inorganic Lecturer.

== Early life and education ==
She earned her PhD in chemical sciences at the University of Florence in 2004. She was a postdoctoral fellow at the University of Pisa, where she worked on the mechanisms by which metal-complexes that are used as anti-cancer agents activate. She used both spectroscopy, including mass spectrometry imaging, and molecular biology.

== Research and career ==
Angela Casini joined the École Polytechnique Fédérale de Lausanne as a Principal Investigator in 2008. She moved to the University of Groningen in 2011, where she was made a Rosalind Franklin Fellow. She was made a Chair of Medicinal Chemistry at Cardiff University in 2015, and has served as Director of Postgraduate Teaching from 2018. She spent 2016 as a visiting professor at the Technical University of Munich.

=== Awards and honours ===
Her awards and honours include;

- 2012 European Medal for Bio-Inorganic Chemistry
- 2014 Gordon Research Conference Early Career Investigator
- 2014 Thomson Reuters World's Most Influential Scientific Mind
- 2016 Elected to the Young Academy of Europe
- 2018 Burghausen Diamond of Chemistry Award
- 2019 American Chemical Society Inorganic Lectureship Award

=== Selected publications ===
Her publications include;

- Casini, Angela (2003). "Carbonic anhydrase inhibitors". Medicinal Research Reviews. 23 (2): 146–189. doi:10.1002/med.10025. PMID 12500287. S2CID 90349277.
- Casini, Angela (2004). "Hypoxia activates the capacity of tumor-associated carbonic anhydrase IX to acidify extracellular pH". FEBS Letters. 577 (3): 439–445. doi:10.1016/j.febslet.2004.10.043. PMID 15556624. S2CID 37646843.
- Casini, Angela (2004). "Unexpected nanomolar inhibition of carbonic anhydrase by COX-2-selective celecoxib: new pharmacological opportunities due to related binding site recognition". Journal of Medicinal Chemistry. 47 (3): 550–557. doi:10.1021/jm030912m. PMID 14736236.

Casini serves on the editorial board of the Journal of Biological Inorganic Chemistry and the Journal of Inorganic Biochemistry.
