= Leonard Francis Lindoy =

Australian chemist

Leonard Francis Lindoy AO FAA
- Born: Wollongong, New South Wales
- Education: BSc, MSc, PhD, DSc
- Alma mater: University of New South Wales
- Occupation: academic
- Known for: macrocyclic and supramolecular chemistry
- Title: Professor of Inorganic Chemistry (1987- ), James Cook University; Professor of Inorganic Chemistry (1996- ), University of Sydney; Elected fellow of the Australian Academy of Science, 1993
- Awards: Burrows Award, 1995; H G Smith Memorial Medal, 1995; Centenary Medal, 2001; RACI Distinguished Fellowship, 2005; Leighton Memorial Medal, 2008; RSC Centenary Lectureship and Medal, 2009; Craig Medal, 2009

Leonard Francis Lindoy, AO FAA, (born 1937) is an Australian chemist with interests in macrocyclic chemistry and metallo-supramolecular chemistry, and an Emeritus Professor of Inorganic Chemistry at the University of Sydney and James Cook University. He moved to the University of Sydney in 1996 to take up the departmental chair in inorganic chemistry vacated by Hans Freeman.

== Honours and recognition ==
Lindoy has been recognised for his professional achievements with Fellowships in the Royal Australian Chemical Institute (RACI), the Royal Society of Chemistry (RSC), the Royal Society of New South Wales (RSN) and in 1993, the Australian Academy of Science (FAA). In 1995, Lindoy received both the H G Smith Memorial Medal and the Burrows Award, the premier award of the Inorganic Chemistry Division of the RACI. Lindoy's contributions were also recognised by the Australian Government in 2001 with a Centenary Medal for "service to Australian society and science in inorganic chemistry". In 2005, he was awarded an RACI Distinguished Fellowship and he went on to receive the 2008 Leighton Memorial Medal which is "the RACI's most prestigious medal and is awarded in recognition of eminent services to chemistry in Australia in the broadest sense." In 2009, he received both the Australian Academy of Science's Craig Medal and a Royal Society of Chemistry (RSC) Centenary Lectureship and Medal.

Lindoy was appointed an Officer of the Order of Australia in the 2025 King's Birthday Honours for "distinguished service to chemical sciences as a researcher, to tertiary education, and in leadership roles".

== Significant publications ==
- Lindoy, L. F. (1990). The Chemistry of Macrocyclic Ligand Complexes. Cambridge University Press. ISBN 0-521-40985-3.
