= James Naismith (chemist) =

British biologist (born 1968)

James Naismith FRS FRSE FMedSci MAE FRSC FInstP FRSB
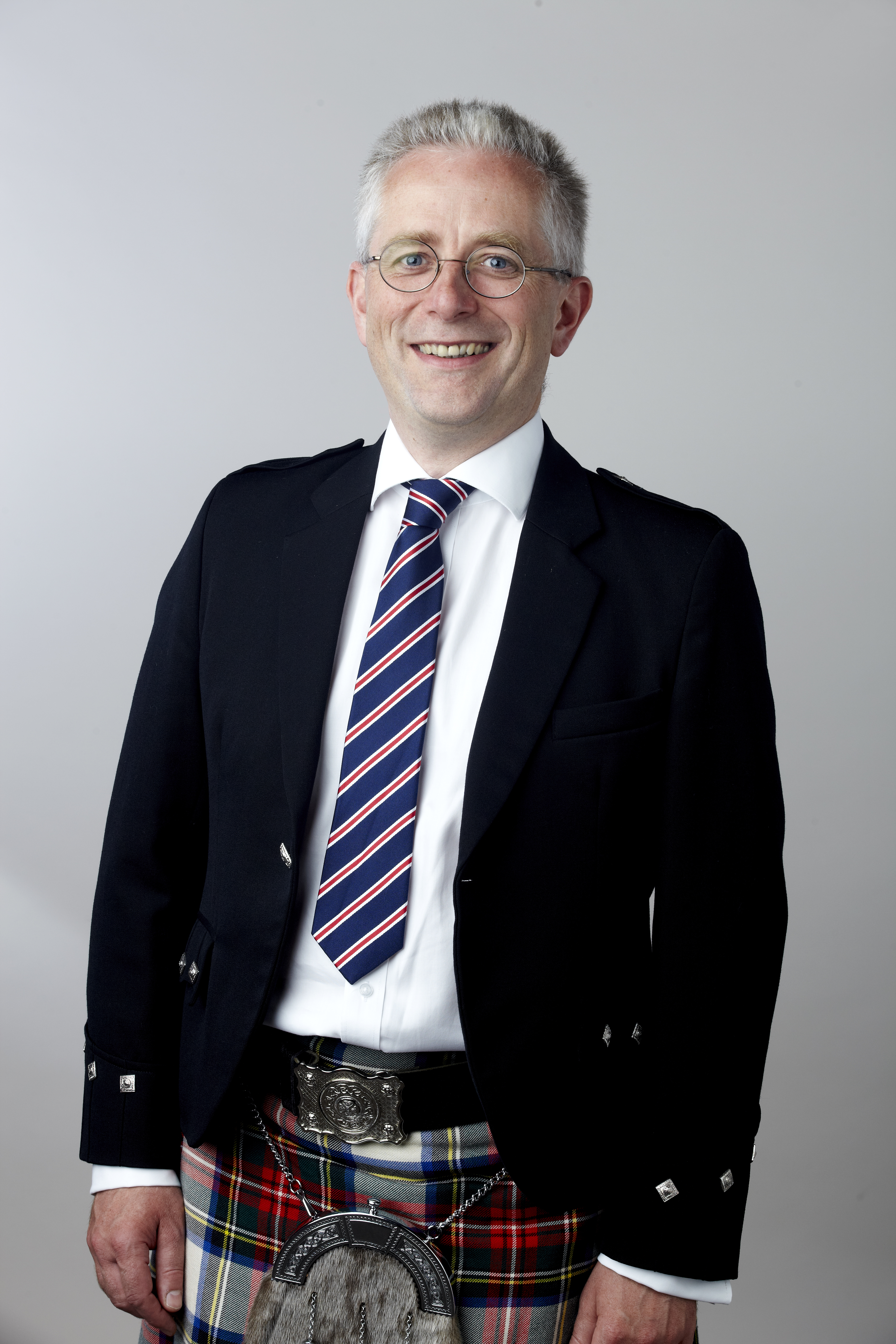
- James Naismith at the Royal Society admissions day in July 2014
- Born: James Henderson Naismith; 26 July 1968 (age 58); Bellshill, Scotland
- Other name: Jim Naismith
- Citizenship: United Kingdom
- Education: University of Edinburgh (BSc); University of Manchester (PhD); University of St Andrews (DSc)
- Known for: Structural biology
- Spouse: Rachel Middleton
- Children: 2
- Awards: Tilden Prize (2019); Fellow AAAS (2016); EMBO Member (2010); Colworth Medal (2004); Corday Morgan Medal (2004)
- Scientific career
- Fields: Enzymology; Chemical Biology; Biochemistry; Structural Biology
- Workplaces: University of Oxford; Rosalind Franklin Institute; University of St Andrews; University of Texas Southwestern Medical Center
- Thesis: Structural studies of concanavalin A and zinc aldolase (1992)
- Doctoral advisor: Bill Hunter; John R. Helliwell; David Garner
- Website: www.rfi.ac.uk/about/people/interim-academic-lead-jim-naismith/

James Henderson Naismith (born 26 July 1968) is a Scot, Professor of Structural Biology and since autumn of 2023 the Head of the Mathematical, Physical, and Life Science Division (MPLS) Division at the University of Oxford. He is also currently Vice-President (non-clinical) of The Academy of Medical Sciences and a Fellow of Jesus College. He was the acting and inaugural Director (2017-2023) of the Rosalind Franklin Institute and Director of the Research Complex at Harwell. He served as Bishop Wardlaw Professor of Chemical Biology at the University of St Andrews. He was a member of Council of the Royal Society (2021-2022) and the Vice-Chair of Council (2022-2024) of the European X-ray Free Electron Laser.

== Education ==
Naismith was named after James VI and I. He was educated at Hamilton Grammar School. He went on to study at the University of Edinburgh where he received a first class Bachelor of Science degree in chemistry in 1989. He won a Carnegie Scholarship to work under the supervision of Bill Hunter, John R. Helliwell and David Garner at the University of Manchester where he received his PhD in 1992 for research into the chemical structure of Concanavalin A and Zinc aldolase. In 2016 he was awarded a Doctor of Science (DSc) by the University of St Andrews.

== Career and research ==
Following his PhD, Naismith did postdoctoral research at the University of Texas Southwestern Medical Center as a NATO Fellow in the laboratory of Stephen Sprang. He was appointed a lecturer at the University of St Andrews in 1995, Reader in 1999 and a Professor in 2001. Naismith's research investigates:

The application of protein structure determination by X-ray crystallography coupled to molecular biology and biochemistry to probe biological mechanisms and to target specific disease pathways. We have ongoing research in

1. signal transduction
2. physical basis of protein carbohydrate interactions
3. pathogenic bacteria glycan assembly, we have cloned and crystallised a number of the enzymes involved in key steps of glycan synthesis in pathogenic bacteria.
4. viral replication, we are purifying and crystallising a heterodimer crucial to replication of viruses in vivo,
5. the biosynthesis of unusual natural products.

His research has been funded by the Biotechnology and Biological Sciences Research Council (BBSRC), the Engineering and Physical Sciences Research Council (EPSRC), the Medical Research Council (MRC), the Wellcome Trust and the European Union.

Naismith joined the University of Oxford in 2017 as Professor of Structural Biology in the Nuffield Department of Medicine and Senior Research Fellow at Jesus College. He directed the Research Complex at Harwell between 2017 and 2019 and the Rosalind Franklin Institute from 2018.

=== Awards and honours ===
Naismith was awarded the 2000 Dextra Carbohydrate award and the 2009 Jeremy Knowles Prize in Chemical Biology both from the Royal Society of Chemistry. Naismith was elected a Fellow of the Royal Society (FRS) in 2014. His nomination reads:

Naismith is cited for his stunning structural and chemical dissection of the many proteins involved in natural product recognition, synthesis and export. His work has revealed new paradigms in the recognition of nucleic acids and carbohydrates, unveiled novel chemical mechanisms for enzymatic nucleophilic substitution and addition and provided the first views, both structural and dynamic, of polysaccharide export systems in bacteria. His work is characterised by a synthesis of three-dimensional structural understanding with profound chemical insight.

Naismith was part of the team awarded a 2022 Royal Society of Chemistry Horizon Prize for their work on nanobodies against Covid19. Naismith is also Fellow of the Royal Society of Chemistry (FRSC), the Royal Society of Biology (FRSB), the Royal Society of Edinburgh (FRSE), the Academy of Medical Sciences, United Kingdom (FMedSci), an elected member of the European Molecular Biology Organization (EMBO), in 2016 was elected a Fellow of the American Association for the Advancement of Science (AAAS) and in 2022 elected a member of Academia Europaea (AE). His nomination for the Academy of Medical Sciences reads:

Jim Naismith is Professor of Chemical Biology at St Andrew's University. He recognised the emerging problem of antibiotic resistance and has devoted his scientific career to the development of new therapeutic compounds and the identification of novel targets specific to microbial pathogens. Highlights include solving the structure and mechanism of a bacterial fluorinating enzyme, determining the mechanism of tryptophan 7-halogenase and establishing the structure of an open Escherichia coli mechanosensitive channel. His contributions have been recognised by the Carbohydrate Chemistry Medal of the Royal Society of Chemistry, the Leverhulme Prize in Molecular Biology and the Colworth Medal of Biochemical Society.

== Personal life ==
Naismith is married to Rachel Middleton with whom he has one son and one daughter.
