= List of biochemistry awards =

This list of biochemistry awards is an index to articles on notable awards for contributions to biochemistry, the study of chemical processes within and relating to living organisms. The list gives the country of the organization that gives the award, but the award may not be limited to people from that country.

== Awards ==
Country	Award	Sponsor	Notes
United Kingdom	Colworth Medal	Biochemical Society	Outstanding research biochemist under the age of 35 and working mainly in the United Kingdom
International	Edison Award	Edison Awards	Honoring excellence in innovation
United States	Eli Lilly Award in Biological Chemistry	American Chemical Society	Biological chemistry by scientists not over thirty-eight years of age
United Kingdom	European Medal for Bio-Inorganic Chemistry	Royal Society of Chemistry	Excellence and Impact in the field of Bioinorganic chemistry
Europe	Datta Lectureship and Medal	Federation of European Biochemical Societies	Outstanding achievement in the field of biochemistry and molecular biology or a related area
Europe	Krebs Medal	Federation of European Biochemical Societies	Outstanding achievements in biochemistry and molecular biology or related sciences
United States	Louisa Gross Horwitz Prize	Columbia University	Outstanding contribution in basic research in the fields of biology or biochemistry
Australia	Macfarlane Burnet Medal and Lecture	Australian Academy of Science	Outstanding scientific research in the biological sciences
United States	Mildred Cohn Award in Biological Chemistry	American Society for Biochemistry and Molecular Biology	Substantial advances in understanding biological chemistry using innovative physical approaches
Switzerland / United States	Novartis-Drew Award (formerly Ciba-Drew Award)	Novartis and Drew University, New Jersey	Selected areas of biomedical research
Germany	Otto Warburg Medal	Society for Biochemistry and Molecular Biology	Important work in the field of biological chemistry
United States	Pfizer Award in Enzyme Chemistry	American Chemical Society	Fundamental research in enzyme chemistry by scientists not over forty years of age
United Kingdom	Portland Press Excellence in Science Award (formerly Novartis Medal and Prize)	Biochemical Society	Research in any branch of biochemistry that was undertaken in the UK or Republic of Ireland
Canada	Prix Michel-Sarrazin	Club de Recherches Clinique du Québec	Celebrated Québécois scientist who, by their dynamism and productivity, have contributed in an important way to the advancement of biomedical research
Canada	Prix Wilder-Penfield	Government of Quebec	Scientists whose research aims fall within the field of biomedicine
United States	Repligen Corporation Award in Chemistry of Biological Processes	American Chemical Society	Outstanding contributions to the understanding of the chemistry of biological processes, with particular emphasis on structure, function, and mechanism
Germany	Schering Prize	Ernst Schering Foundation	Outstanding basic research in the fields of medicine, biology or chemistry anywhere in the world

== See also ==
- Lists of awards
- Lists of science and technology awards
- List of biology awards
- List of chemistry awards
