= Darlene Solomon =

American scientist and business leader

- Born: Darlene Joy Spira; February 7, 1959 (age 66); Walnut Creek, California, US
- Education: Stanford University; Massachusetts Institute of Technology (PhD)
- Alma mater: Stanford University; Massachusetts Institute of Technology
- Known for: Bioengineering
- Spouse: Edward I. Solomon
- Scientific career
- Fields: Bioengineering, Chemical and Biological Systems, Life Sciences, Chemical Analysis, Mass Spectrometry
- Institutions: Hewlett Packard Labs, Agilent Technologies
- Thesis: Detailed chemical and spectroscopic probes of the multicopper active sites in Rhus laccase (1985)
- Doctoral advisor: Edward I. Solomon and William Orme-Johnson

Darlene Joy Solomon (born Darlene Joy Spira, February 7, 1959) is an American scientist. From 2006 to 2023, she was Chief Technology Officer and Senior Vice President for Agilent Technologies.

== Views ==
Solomon has contended that the practice of biological research will transform into an engineering discipline, calling the 21st century "the century of biology" in a keynote address she delivered at IMS2015. During her tenure, Agilent's transformation from an electronics company to a life sciences and diagnostics company exemplifies this change of focus from the "century of physics" to the "century of biology".

== Professional career ==
- 1984–1999: Solomon began her professional career as a research scientist at Hewlett-Packard Labs, eventually becoming the R&D manager for the Chemical and Biological Systems Department.
- 1999–2006: Following Agilent Technologies' spin-off from Hewlett-Packard Labs, she led Research and Development/Technology for Agilent's Life Sciences and Chemical Analysis business. She became the Vice President and Director of Agilent Laboratories in 2003.
- 2006–2023: Senior vice president and chief technology officer for Agilent Technologies

== Education ==
- Bachelor of Science in Chemistry, Stanford University, 1980
- Ph.D. in Bioinorganic Chemistry from the Massachusetts Institute of Technology, 1984
- Completed Stanford University's Executive Development Program

== Honors and awards ==
- Women in Technology International's Hall of Fame Inductee, 2001
- YWCA Tribute to Women and Industry Award, 2004
- Profile in Diversity Journal's Women Worth Watching award recipient, 2006
- One of Corporate Board Member's 50 Top Women in Technology, 2008.
- Elected as a member of the National Academy of Engineering in 2017 with a citation for "...leadership in the development of innovative nucleic acid and microfluidic products for the life science and molecular diagnostic industries"
- USC Viterbi School of Engineering's Daniel J Epstein Engineering Management Award, 2018
- Recognized in Health Care Technology Report's Top 25 Women Leaders In Biotech of 2019
