= Serena DeBeer =

American-born chemist

Prof. Dr. Serena DeBeer
- Born: 1973 (age 52–53)
- Other name: Serena DeBeer George
- Education: Southwestern University, TX B.S. Chemistry (1995); Stanford University Ph.D. Chemistry (2002)
- Known for: X-ray spectroscopy nitrogenase photosystem II hydrogenase Methane monooxygenase
- Scientific career
- Fields: Chemistry
- Workplaces: SSRL SLAC Stanford University (2001–2009); Cornell University (2009-present); Ruhr University Bochum (2014–present) Max Planck Institute for Chemical Energy Conversion (2011–present) University Duisburg-Essen (2024–present)
- Doctoral advisor: Edward I. Solomon; Keith O. Hodgson

Serena DeBeer (born 1973) is an American chemist. She is currently a W3-Professor and the director at the Max Planck Institute for Chemical Energy Conversion in Muelheim an der Ruhr, Germany, where she heads the Department of Inorganic Spectroscopy. Her expertise lies in the application and development of X-ray based spectroscopic methods as probes of electronic structure in biological and chemical catalysis.

== Education and career ==
Serena DeBeer studied at Southwestern University, Georgetown, Texas (US), where she completed her bachelor program in chemistry, with minor in mathematics in 1995 (with honors). She received her doctorate from Stanford University in 2002, working under the guidance of Edward I. Solomon and Keith O. Hodgson. She then moved to SLAC National Accelerator Laboratory, where she worked first as a beamline scientist (2001–2003) at the Stanford Synchrotron Radiation Laboratory, and later as staff scientist (2003–2009). In the Fall of 2009, she relocated to Cornell University in Ithaca, NY (USA), where she accepted a faculty position as assistant professor at the department of chemistry and chemical biology. In the Summer of 2011, she moved to Germany and started to work as a W2-Professor and research group leader at the Max Planck Institute for Bioinorganic Chemistry (since 2012 Max Planck Institute for Chemical Energy Conversion, MPI CEC) in Mülheim an der Ruhr, Germany. Since 2012 she has held the position of an adjunct professor at Cornell University as well as an honorary faculty position at Ruhr University Bochum since 2014. DeBeer headed the research group "X-ray Spectroscopy" at MPI CEC until 2017 when she was appointed director at this institute and promoted to a W3-Professor. Currently she leads the department of "Inorganic Spectroscopy" at MPI CEC. Additionally, she is the group leader of the PINK beamline project at the Energy and Materials In-Situ Laboratory at the Helmholtz Zentrum Berlin, Germany. Since 2024, Serena has held an honorary faculty position at University Duisburg-Essen.

== Research ==
Research in the DeBeer group focuses on answering fundamental questions in energy research. Namely, how does one reversibly store and release energy from chemical bonds using earth abundant transition metals? And how is this done most efficiently? Her research group studies homogeneous, heterogeneous and biological catalysts in order to answer these questions, with a primary focus on enzymatic catalysis. She is an expert in the application of advanced X-ray spectroscopy to understand catalytic transformations.

=== Nitrogenase ===
A strong focus of her research is to study the enzyme that is responsible for the conversion of dinitrogen (N_{2}) to ammonia (NH_{3})—Nitrogenase. Serena DeBeer and her group study this remarkable system comprising a FeMo cofactor (FeMoco) as its active site, and structural model complexes utilizing high-resolution X-ray absorption (XAS) and X-ray emission spectroscopy (XES). Through this work, great progress has been made in understanding the structure of this active site. A key contribution was a spectroscopic identification of the central atom in the active site as a carbide. Moreover, the application of high-resolution XAS spectroscopy supported with theoretical calculations, allowed her group to succeed in the assignment of the oxidation state of the Mo atom in the FeMoco as Mo(III). This study was followed up later with the experimental evidence of a non-Hund spin configuration at the Mo atom by means of X-ray Magnetic Circular Dichroism (XMCD) spectroscopy. Another approach in this field concerns comparative studies of different forms of nitrogenase enzymes with FeMoco and FeVco active sites, Selenium-incorporated FeMoco, as well as spectroscopic characterization of the first intermediate state of the nitrogenase catalytic cycle (E_{1}).

=== Methane monooxygenase ===
Another important chemical conversion studied by her group is the catalytic oxidation of methane to methanol. Nature utilizes a group of enzymes called methane monooxygenase (MMOs). The active site of this enzyme that enables the cleavage of the C-H of methane is a dinuclear Fe(IV) intermediate Q found in the hydroxylase protein (MMOH) of MMO. Spectroscopic studies in the DeBeer group have provided new insights into the structure of this diiron complex. Through applications of advanced X-ray spectroscopic studies like high-resolution XAS they characterized the key intermediate in biological methane oxidation as an open-core diiron structure (with Fe^{IV}=O motif). Additional EXAFS studies confirmed this finding by showing no evidence for a short Fe-Fe distance but rather a long diiron distance consistent with an open-core structure.

=== Spectroscopy Development ===
Recent work of DeBeer's group has focused on developing the full information content of various X-ray spectroscopic methods and their application to biological catalysts.

Among these methods are:

==== Valence X-ray Emission Spectroscopy ====
In this method (also known as VtC XES = Valence-to-Core X-ray Emission Spectroscopy), one monitors the resultant fluorescence after a valence electron refills the ionized metal 1s core hole. As such, valence XES spectra provide a map of ligand ionization energies, and provides information on both ligand identity and protonation state. A prominent application of this method its use to identify the central carbon atom in FeMo cofactor of Nitrogenase (see section Nitrogenase).

==== Resonant valence XES (RXES) or Resonant Inelastic X-ray Scattering (RIXS) ====
The DeBeer group is actively involved in the development and application of RXES/RIXS based methods in both the hard and soft X-ray regime. These include 1s-Valence RIXS as a means to obtain ligand-selective XAS and 2p3d RIXS as a means to map out the d-d excitations.

==== X-ray Magnetic Circular Dichroism (XMCD) ====
This method has been extensively used in solid-state materials, to determine the magnetic properties. Past applications to (bio-)inorganic or protein systems were lacking proper qualitative and quantitative interpretations. DeBeer's group expanded the information that can be obtained from XMCD of covalent systems. To date, this been the only one method able to provide evidence for the proposed non-Hund configuration at the Mo atom in Nitrogenase (see section Nitrogeanse).

=== Instrumentation ===
==== A laboratory based dispersive X-ray Emission Spectrometer ====
The group of Serena DeBeer in collaboration with the group of Prof. Birgit Kangießer at TU Berlin, developed an in-house dispersive X-ray Emission Spectroscopy (XES) setup. The setup that utilizes a laboratory X‑ray source (Metal Jet) in combination with a von Hamos full cylinder optic with Highly Annealed Pyrolytic Graphite (HAPG) crystal and a CCD detector. This allows obtaining spectra in the 2.4-9 keV range. Moreover, this spectrometer is an alternative to synchrotron-based beamlines for concentrated samples.

==== PINK Beamline ====
The DeBeer group is also leading the development of the PINK beamline at the Energy Materials In-situ Laboratory at the Helmholtz Zentrum Berlin. Dr. Sergey Peredkov is the lead designer and instrument scientist for this project. This beamline operates in 2-10 keV energy regime, either in a “pink” beam mode with multilayer mirror or with monochromatic beam (by addition of a double crystal monochromator). The beamline is presently in a commissioning phase.

== Awards and recognition ==
- 2023 Glenn T. Seaborg Memorial Lectures in Inorganic Chemistry
- 2022 R.J.P. Williams Lectureship, Oxford University
- 2022 Malcom H. Chisholm Lecturer, The Ohio State University
- 2021 Fellow of the Royal Society of Chemistry
- European Research Council (ERC) Synergy Grant for the project: Unravelling the secrets of Cu-based catalysts for C-H activation (CUBE). Collaborative project with researchers from University of Oslo (Norway), Norwegian University of Life Sciences (Norway) and University of Turin (Italy) (2019)
- Associate Editor for Chemical Science (2018–present)
- Inorganic Chemistry Lectureship Award (2016)
- Society of Biological Inorganic Chemistry (SBIC), Early Career Award (2015)
- European Research Council (ERC) Consolidator grant for the project: Spectroscopic Studies of N_{2} Reduction: From Biological to Heterogeneous Catalysis (N2ase) (2013)
- Kavli Fellow, U.S. National Academy of Sciences (2012)
- Alfred P. Sloan Research Fellow (2011–2013)
