= Edward I. Solomon =

American bioinorganic chemist

- Born: Edward Ira Solomon; 1946 (age 79–80); North Miami Beach, Florida
- Education: Rensselaer Polytechnic Institute B.S. (1968); Princeton University Ph.D. (1972)
- Spouse: Darlene Solomon
- Scientific career
- Fields: Bioinorganic Chemistry, Spectroscopy, Theoretical Chemistry
- Workplaces: Stanford University
- Thesis: The Jahn-Teller Effect in the Orbital Triplet Excited States of Octahedral Manganese(II) (1972)
- Doctoral advisor: Donald S. McClure
- Other academic advisors: Carl J. Ballhausen, Harry B. Gray
- Doctoral students: Serena DeBeer, Darlene Joy Spira
- Other notable students: Frank Neese, Thomas Brunold, James Penner-Hahn
- Website: web.stanford.edu/group/solomon/home.html

Edward I. Solomon (born 1946) is the Monroe E. Spaght Professor of Chemistry at Stanford University. He is an elected member of the United States National Academy of Sciences, a Fellow of the American Association for the Advancement of Science, and a Fellow of the American Academy of Arts and Sciences. He has been profiled in the Proceedings of the National Academy of Sciences. He has been a longtime collaborator with many scientists, including his colleague at Stanford University Keith Hodgson for the study of metalloenzyme active sites by x-ray spectroscopy, along with the synthetic chemists Richard H. Holm, Stephen J. Lippard, Lawrence Que Jr. and Kenneth D. Karlin.

== Early life and education ==
Solomon grew up in North Miami Beach, Florida. In his junior year of high school, he became involved in a local program that allowed exceptional students to work with university professors. Solomon conducted research with a professor at the University of Miami, using biochemistry and chromatography to study indoles, which led to him becoming Florida's first-ever finalist for the Westinghouse Science Talent Search in 1964.

He then studied chemistry at Renesselaer Polytechnic Institute, graduating with a B.S. degree in 1968. During his undergraduate, he worked with Prof. Sam Wait and Prof. Henry Hollinger in theoretical chemistry. Solomon went on to Princeton University to conduct graduate studies with physical chemist Prof. Donald McClure, where he studied the Jahn–Teller effect in the excited states of Mn^{2+} ions in RbMnF_{3}. Shortly after Solomon received his Ph.D. in chemistry in 1972, his advisor McClure went on sabbatical and asked Solomon to stay and help oversee his research group. At this time, McClure and Prof. Thomas G. Spiro hosted a symposium that hosted many leaders in physical inorganic chemistry. It was at this symposium that Solomon decided he wanted to work with Prof. Harry B. Gray during his post-doctoral studies.

Solomon spent a year in Copenhagen, Denmark at the Hans Christian Ørsted Institute to work as a postdoctoral fellow under Prof. Carl J. Ballhausen. He then moved to Caltech with to do postdoctoral research with Prof. Harry B. Gray from 1974 to 1975.

== Research ==
Solomon began his independent career in late 1975 at the Massachusetts Institute of Technology as an assistant professor, where he continued to study blue copper proteins. In 1981, he was promoted to the rank of full professor, and in 1982 he moved to Stanford University. At this point, bioinorganic chemistry became the dominant focus of his laboratory.

Solomon's research focuses on the spectroscopic study of metal-containing enzymes involved in electron transfers and oxygen activation, and small molecules mimicking the active sites of these enzymes. These include copper-containing enzymes such as azurin, plastocyanin and laccase, as well as non-heme iron enzymes such as (4-hydroxy)mandelate synthase and (4-hydroxyphenyl)pyruvate dioxygenase. He is an expert in magnetic circular dichroism spectroscopy.

=== Research highlights ===
- Elucidation of the tyrosinase dicopper active site mechanism
- Demonstration that a trinuclear copper active site exists in the laccase enzyme
- Demonstration of the entatic state of the blue copper protein
- Development of Variable Temperature, Variable Field (VTVH) magnetic circular dichroism (MCD) spectroscopy to study non-heme iron enzyme active sites
- Development of metal L-edge, ligand K-edge x-ray absorption spectroscopy and resonant inelastic x-ray scattering to investigate metal-ligand covalency.

== Awards ==
- Alfred P. Sloan Foundation Fellow, 1976–79
- Dupont and General Electric Young Faculty Awards, 1979–80
- JSPS Fellow (1995, 2002, 2009)
- NIH MERIT Award (1995 & 2002)
- Remsen Award (1994)
- Wheland Medal, University of Chicago (2000)
- Frontiers in Biological Chemistry Award, Max-Planck Institute (2001)
- Bailar Medal, University of Illinois (2007)
- Thomas Chemistry Scholar (2007)
- Ira Remsen Award
- Kosolapoff Award
- Dean's Award for Distinguished Teaching, Stanford University (1990)
- ACS Award in Inorganic Chemistry (2001)
- Centenary Medal and Lectureship, Royal Society of Chemistry (2003)
- ACS Award for Distinguished Service in the Advancement of Inorganic Chemistry (2006)
- Chakravorty Award & Lecturership, Chemical Research Society of India (2008)
- Alfred Bader Award in Bioinorganic or Bioorganic Chemistry, American Chemical Society (2016)
- Fred Basolo Medal for Outstanding Research in Inorganic Chemistry, Northwestern University (2018)
- Associate editor, Inorganic Chemistry
- Editorial Advisory Board Member for 14 journals
- McElvain (1983), World Bank (1984), O. K. Rice (1984), Reilly (1986), Frontiers (1990), 1st Seaborg (1990), Frontiers in Chemistry (1991), ACS (1992), National Science Council (1993), Xerox (1994), Leermakers (1994), Amoco (1995), Kahn (1996), Golden Jubilee (1996), Karcher (1997), FMC (1998), Colloquium 3eme Cycle (1998), A.D. Little (1998), Aldrich (2001), Hill Memorial (2003), Cady (2003), Kieler Woche (2003), Crawford (2004), Walton (2005), Endicott/Rorabacker Frontier (2006), Dawson (2007), Frontiers (2007), Procter & Gamble (2008), Andreas Albrecht (2009), Hans B. Jonassen (2009), Harteck (2009), Sunney Chan (2009) Faraday (2010), Vaughan (2011), Hans Freeman (2012), Ross (2013), Ibers (2024) Lectures

== Professional memberships ==
- Fellow of the American Association for the Advancement of Science (1981)
- Fellow of the American Academy of Arts and Sciences (1998)
- Member of the National Academy of Sciences (2005)
- Fellow of the American Chemical Society (2009)
