= European Biological Inorganic Chemistry Conference =

European binannual conference on bioinorganic chemistry since 1992

The European Biological Inorganic Chemistry Conference, or EUROBIC, is a biannual conference on Bioinorganic chemistry founded in 1992. The conference is held in Europe but attracts scientists from all over the world. EUROBIC was the result of a merger of the Swiss-Italian SIMBIC conference and the French-German SAMBAS conference. The aim is to create a forum and promote collaboration between scientists in the highly multidisciplinary field of Biological Inorganic Chemistry, ranging from biology to inorganic chemistry.

Since 1994 (EUROBIC-2), the European Medal for Bio-Inorganic Chemistry, also called the EUROBIC award, is presented in conjunction with the conference, customary as part of the closing ceremony.

== European Medal for Bio-Inorganic Chemistry ==
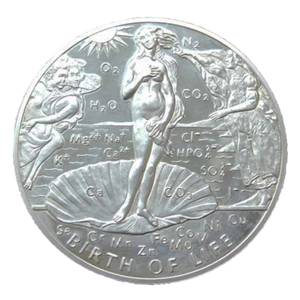
The European Medal for Bio-Inorganic Chemistry depicts Venus from the Italian renaissance painting The Birth of Venus (Botticelli) by Sandro Botticelli (1444–1510). Venus, representing the life force, is depicted as rising from the sea, surrounded by inorganic molecules and elements essential for the origin of life. The medal motif is a variation of the logotype of the Society of Biological Inorganic Chemistry, intended to portray a renaissance in inorganic chemistry, through its impact on modern biology.

The European Medal for Bio-Inorganic Chemistry, also called the EUROBIC Medal or EUROBIC Award, was founded after the first European Biological Inorganic Chemistry Conference (EUROBIC-1), held in Newcastle, UK, in 1992. In 1993, a basic endowment was established and administered by the Royal Society of Chemistry until 2024, when the remaining funds were used to produce 12 additional medals, covering the next 20+ years. The medal blanks are kept at the Department of Chemistry, University of Zurich, Switzerland.

The medal has since been presented in conjunction with the EUROBIC conferences, held every second year. The selection committee is assembled by the EUROBIC secretary and consists of senior bioinorganic scientists from 6-10 different countries in Europe.

The award is presented to a European scientist, or a scientist with a career in Europe, for "Excellence and Impact in the field" of Bioinorganic chemistry. From 2008 the award is intended to be primarily dedicated to young or mid-career scientists in the field.

=== EUROBIC Medalists ===
Source: Eurobics Award

- 2026: Anna F. A. Peacock, University of Birmingham, Edgbaston, UK.
- 2024: Gustav Berggren, Uppsala University, Uppsala, Sweden.
- 2022: Maxie M. Roessler, Imperial College London.
- 2020: Aidan R. McDonald, University of Dublin, Ireland; Prof. Kallol Ray, Humboldt-University Berlin, Germany
- 2018: Gilles Gasser, Chimie ParisTech, PSL Research University Laboratory for Inorganic Chemical Biology, Paris France.
- 2016: Christelle Hureau, Coordination Chemistry Laboratory - UPR CNRS 8241, Toulouse, France.
- 2014: Xile Hu, Ecole Polytechnique Fédérale de Lausanne (EPFL), Switzerland.
- 2012: Angela Casini, University of Groningen, the Netherlands.
- 2010: Martin Högbom, Stockholm University, Sweden.
- 2008: Roland K. O. Sigel, University of Zurich, Switzerland.
- 2006: Antonio V. Xavier, The New University of Lisbon, Portugal.
- 2004: Maria Arménia Carrondo, The New University of Lisbon, Portugal.
- 2002: Peter M. H. Kroneck, University of Konstanz, Germany.
- 2000: Simon P. J. Albracht, University of Amsterdam, the Netherlands; Prof. Juan C. Fontecilla-Camps, University Joseph Fourier, France.
- 1998: Fraser A. Armstrong, University of Oxford, UK.
- 1996: Claudio Luchinat, University of Florence, Italy.
- 1994: Wilfred R. Hagen, Delft University of Technology, The Netherlands.

== See also ==
- List of biochemistry awards
