= James Penner-Hahn =

James Penner-Hahn (born 27 August 1957) is the George A. Lindsay Collegiate Professor of Chemistry and Biophysics at the University of Michigan. He completed a Bachelor of Science degree with Honors at Purdue University in 1979 and a PhD at Stanford University in 1984 under Keith Hodgson; his dissertation was titled X-ray Absorption Studies of Metalloprotein Structure: Cytochrome P-450, Horseradish Peroxidase, Plastocyanin, and Laccase. Penner-Hahn's research involves biophysical chemistry and inorganic spectroscopy including EXAFS and synchrotron radiation techniques which he helped to develop in his doctoral and post-doctoral work with Edward Solomon and Hodgson. He was elected as a Fellow of the American Association for the Advancement of Science in 2004.
