= Fraser Armstrong (professor) =

British chemist and academic

Fraser Armstrong FRS
- Born: Fraser Andrew Armstrong; Cambridge
- Education: University of Leeds (BSc, PhD)
- Awards: Davy Medal (2012); Royal Society University Research Fellowship (1983–1989)
- Scientific career
- Fields: Chemistry
- Workplaces: University of Oxford; University of California, Irvine
- Thesis: Kinetic studies on some redox and substitution processes in aqueous media : Part one: Further studies with molybdenum (V); Part two: Reactions of ferredoxins (1978)
- Doctoral students: Judy Hirst
- Other notable students: Sophie E. Jackson
- Website: armstrong.chem.ox.ac.uk

Fraser Andrew Armstrong FRS is a professor of chemistry at the University of Oxford and a Fellow of St John's College, Oxford.

== Early life and education ==
Fraser Armstrong was born in Cambridge, England, in 1951. He obtained his Bachelor of Science degree in 1975 followed by a PhD in 1978 from the University of Leeds supervised by Geoff Sykes.

== Career and research ==
After his PhD, Armstrong carried out postdoctoral research with Peter Kroneck (Konstanz), Ralph Wilkins (New Mexico), Helmut Beinert (Madison), and Allen Hill (Oxford).

In 1983 he was awarded a Royal Society University Research Fellowship which he held in Oxford until 1989, when he joined the Chemistry Faculty at the University of California, Irvine. He moved to his present position in 1993. His interests are in biological redox chemistry, in particular the application of dynamic electrochemical techniques in studies of complex electron-transfer and catalytic reactions in proteins (protein film voltammetry), and most recently the mechanisms and exploitation of biological hydrogen cycling. He was the president of the Society of Biological Inorganic Chemistry (SBIC) from 2004 to 2006. With Katherine Blundell he co-edited the book Energy... beyond Oil.

=== Honours and awards ===
- 1998 European Medal for Biological Inorganic Chemistry
- 2000 The Royal Society of Chemistry award for Inorganic Biochemistry
- 2003 Carbon Trust Academic Innovation Award (with Kylie Vincent)
- 2004 Max-Planck "Frontiers in Biological Chemistry" Award
- 2006 The Royal Society of Chemistry Medal for Interdisciplinary Chemistry
- 2008 Elected a Fellow of the Royal Society (FRS)
- 2010 The Royal Society of Chemistry Joseph Chatt Award.
- 2012 The Royal Society Davy Medal.
- 2012 The Royal Society of Chemistry Barker Award
