= Monroe Spaght =

Monroe Edward Spaght, born 9 Dec 1909, died 27 Jun 1993, was a research chemist who became president and chairman of the Shell Oil Company. In 1965, he became the first American managing director of the Royal Dutch Petroleum Company, Shell's parent company.

== Early life ==
He earned his BS, MA, and PhD degrees from Stanford University; and he studied physics at the University of Leipzig.

== Career ==
Spaght liked to call himself "just a country boy from Eureka, California." In the course of lifetime, he evolved in unexpected ways. He began working for Shell as a researcher in 1933. In his climb up the corporate ladder, he was named president of the Shell Development Company in 1949. He became executive vice president of Shell Oil in New York in 1953, president in 1961, and chairman from 1965.

In 1965 he was also named one of seven managing directors of Royal Dutch Shell, which is based in London. The company by-laws had to be changed to accommodate a director with citizenship in a country other than the Netherlands or the United Kingdom. Until that time, the board of directors had been composed of four British and three Dutch members. In that period, Royal Dutch Petroleum ran 500 subsidiaries worldwide.

Spaght retired in 1970 but remained a director of Royal Dutch and Shell for 10 more years.

=== Corporate philosophy ===
In Shell's upper management, Spaght often advocated that the ancient Greek ideal of arete (excellence) had a place in the company's core values and corporate philosophy. In his view, "Arete conveyed the idea of wholeness, of the fullest and finest exercise of one's abilities in all activities recognized as good. The Greeks prized it, strove for it, and rewarded it whenever it appeared." Spaght urged the company's managers to do the same.

== Selected works ==
Seki's published writings encompass 12 works in 15 publications in 2 languages and 978 library holdings.

- 1965 -- The Bright Key: Thoughts on the Relation of Business to Research and Education. New York: Appleton-Century-Crofts. OCLC 177921.
- 1985 -- The Long Road from Eureka: An Autobiography.. England:[the author]. OCLC 15962340.
- 1978 -- The Multinational Corporation: Its Manners, Methods and Myths.. Pittsburgh: Carnegie-Mellon University Press. OCLC 6001392.

== Honors ==
- Order of Francisco de Miranda (Venezuela), 1968.
- Order of Orange-Nassau (Netherlands), 1970.
- A named Chair in Chemistry was created in his honor at Stanford University; the incumbent Monroe E. Spaght Professor of Chemistry is Edward I. Solomon.
- Chemical Industry Medal (1966)
