= Rosalind Franklin Institute =

English research centre

- Established: 6 June 2018; 8 years ago
- Research type: Applied
- Field of research: Medical
- Director: Paul Matthews
- Chair: Vivienne Cox
- Location: Curie Ave, Didcot, Oxfordshire, OX11 0QX, England
- Campus: Harwell Science and Innovation Campus
- Website: Official website

The Rosalind Franklin Institute is a physical sciences research centre devoted to developing new technologies for medical research and the life sciences. They are supported by the Government of the United Kingdom located at the Harwell Science and Innovation Campus, Oxfordshire, England. It is named after an English chemist Rosalind Franklin, whose discoveries provided the key data for the correct explanation of the helical structure of DNA in 1953. Launched on 6 June 2018, it was officially opened on 29 September 2021.

The government approval was announced on 23 February 2017 by Greg Clark, Secretary of State for Business, Energy and Industrial Strategy. According to the press release the basis of the name was "in honour of the pioneering British scientist [Rosalind Franklin] whose use of X-rays to study biological structures played a crucial role in the discovery of DNA's 'double helix' structure by Francis Crick and James Watson". The objective was "to develop disruptive new technologies designed to tackle major challenges in health and life sciences, accelerate the discovery of new treatments for chronic diseases affecting millions of people around the world (such as dementia), and deliver new jobs and long-term growth to the local and UK economies."

The proposal of the institute was led by Ian Walmsley, Pro-Vice Chancellor at the University of Oxford, and the project was initiated under the lead of Andrew Livingston, Professor of Chemical Engineering at Imperial College London and James H Naismith, Professor of Structural Biology at Oxford University. Originally funded with £103 million by the Engineering and Physical Sciences Research Council. The Franklin has twelve partners - the Science and Technology Facilities Council (STFC), Diamond Light Source, University of Birmingham, University of Cambridge, University of Edinburgh, Imperial, King's College London, University of Leeds, Manchester, University of Oxford, University of Southampton, and University College London.

In July 2018, Vivienne Cox was appointed the first Chair, and in June 2019, Jim Naismith became the first Director. Paul Matthews became the second Director of the Institute in April 2024.

== Research ==
The work at the Rosalind Franklin Institute will develop new instruments, create new ways of working and integrating previously disparate approaches.

The Franklin has five core scientific themes – Artificial Intelligence, Biological Mass Spectrometry, Correlated Imaging, Next Generation Chemistry and Structural Biology – which work as interdisciplinary teams to develop their new technologies.

== Building and facilities ==
The Rosalind Franklin Institute is located in the Harwell Science and Innovation Campus which is also home to the Diamond Light Source synchrotron, Isis Neutron Spallation source, and the Central Laser Facility.

The building was opened by Professor Lynn Gladden, Chief Executive of the Engineering and Physical Sciences Research Council, which funds the Franklin, and delegates from industry and academia, including Nobel Prize winner Richard Henderson.

The £43m building, constructed by UKRI-STFC working with Mace and project managed by AECOM The IBI group were awarded the "Excellence in Architectural Technology, Medium-Mega 2021" for their work on the building.
