= Vivienne Cox =

British businesswoman

Vivienne Cox DBE
- Born: Dame Vivienne Cox; May 1959 (age 67)
- Occupations: Businesswoman, chairman of the supervisory board of Vallourec

Dame Vivienne Cox, DBE (born May 1959) is a British businesswoman, chairman of the supervisory board of Vallourec, the French multinational steel components company.

Cox was born in 1959 and grew up in Devon. She attended St Catherine's College and graduated from the University of Oxford with an MA in chemistry and from INSEAD with an MBA degree. She holds honorary doctorates from the University of Hull and the University of Hertfordshire.

Cox joined the British oil company BP in 1981 to become head of the company's alternative energy division, and the highest ranking female staff. She resigned in 2009. She then became chairperson of the supervisory board of Vallourec, a French multinational steel components company. She is also a non-executive director of Pearson PLC and a commissioner at the UK's Airports Commission. By 2011, she became the Chairman of Climate Change Capital, a green investment and management firm.

Since July 2016, Cox has been a non-executive director of GlaxoSmithKline. In July 2018, she became the first Chair of the Rosalind Franklin Institute. In 2021, she was appointed chairwoman of Victrex, the supplier of polymers. In 2025, she became director of both Pyrol Investco and Endolys.

== Honours ==
Cox was appointed Commander of the Order of the British Empire (CBE) in the 2016 New Year Honours for services to the economy and sustainability and Dame Commander of the Order of the British Empire (DBE) in the 2022 New Year Honours for services to sustainability, and to diversity and inclusion in business.
