= Journal of Inorganic Biochemistry =

- Discipline: Bioinorganic chemistry
- Language: English
- Edited by: J.H. Dawson

Publication details
- Former name(s): Bioinorganic Chemistry
- History: 1971–present
- Publisher: Elsevier
- Frequency: Monthly
- Impact factor: 4.155 (2020)

Standard abbreviations
- ISO 4: J. Inorg. Biochem.

Indexing
- CODEN: JIBIDJ
- ISSN: 0162-0134 (print); 1873-3344 (web)
- LCCN: 79642923
- OCLC no.: 780589679

Links
- Journal homepage; Online access

The Journal of Inorganic Biochemistry is a monthly peer-reviewed scientific journal covering research on the inorganic aspects of biochemistry, such as metalloenzymes and metallobiomolecules. The journal was established in 1971 as Bioinorganic Chemistry, obtaining its current name in 1979. Since 1996, the editor-in-chief has been John H. Dawson (University of South Carolina).

According to the Journal Citation Reports, the journal has a 2020 impact factor of 4.155, ranking it 7th out of 44 journals in the category "Chemistry, Inorganic and Nuclear".
