= Martin Högbom =

Swedish biochemist and structural biologist (born 1974)

- Born: 29 May 1974 (age 52)
- Scientific career
- Fields: Biochemistry; Structural biology Bio-inorganic chemistry
- Institutions: Stockholm University; Stanford University

Martin Ivar Högbom (born 29 May 1974) is a Swedish biochemist and structural biologist. He was appointed professor of structural biochemistry at Stockholm University in 2013 and worked as visiting professor at Stanford University during 2016 and 2018.

Högbom's research regards bio-inorganic chemistry, mainly how enzymes employ metal ions and radical species to perform particularly challenging chemical reactions. The research concerns biological energy conversion, deoxyribonucleotide synthesis, and biochemical oxidation of hydrocarbons.

Högbom was awarded The European Medal for Bio-Inorganic Chemistry in 2010 and the Svedberg prize in 2012.

He was a member of the Young Academy of Sweden (2011–2016) and served as its president from 2014 to 2015. He was elected as a member of the Royal Swedish Academy of Sciences in 2020.
