= John R. Helliwell =

British crystallographer (born 1953)

John R. Helliwell (born 1953, Wickersley, Yorkshire) is a British crystallographer known for his pioneering work in the use of synchrotron radiation in macromolecular crystallography.

== Education and career ==
Helliwell studied physics at the University of York and obtained a PhD from the University of Oxford in 1978. For many years he was closely associated with the Synchrotron Radiation Source at Daresbury Laboratory, while also holding positions at the University of Keele, the University of York and the University of Manchester, where he is now an Emeritus Professor. His research has contributed to over 100 Protein Data Bank crystal structure depositions spanning enzymes, lectins and crustacyanins with ligands such as saccharides, carotenoids and metallodrugs or metalloimaging agents.

== Awards and honours ==
In 2014, the American Crystallographic Association awarded Helliwell the A. L. Patterson Award for `his pioneering contributions to the development of the instrumentation, methods and applications of synchrotron radiation in macromolecular crystallography', and in 2015 he was awarded the Max Perutz Prize by the European Crystallographic Association for `his long, generous and fruitful dedication to developing all aspects of the use of synchrotron radiation for crystallography and for his boosting support to global development of synchrotron and neutron facilities'. In 2000, he was awarded the Professor K. Banerjee Centennial Silver Medal by the Indian Association for the Cultivation of Science.

John Helliwell was made an Honorary Member of the Slovenian National Institute of Chemistry in 1996, a Fellow of the American Crystallographic Association in 2015, an honorary member of the British Biophysical Society in 2016 and an honorary member of the British Crystallographic Association in 2019. He is also a member of the Royal Academy of Sciences and Arts of Barcelona.

John Helliwell is a Fellow of the Institute of Physics, the Royal Society of Chemistry and the Royal Society of Biology.

== Service to the scientific community ==
John Helliwell served as Editor in Chief of Acta Crystallographica and Chairman of the International Union of Crystallography Commission on Journals from 1996 to 2005, and in numerous other roles at the IUCr; he was Chair of the IUCr Committee on Data from 2017 to 2023. Helliwell was interviewed by the Main Editors of Acta Crystallographica Section F: Structural Biology Communications. He was also President of the European Crystallographic Association from 2006 to 2009.

== Bibliography ==
- Helliwell, John R. (1992). Macromolecular Crystallography with Synchrotron Radiation. Cambridge: Cambridge University Press. ISBN 978-0521334679.
- Chayen, Naomi E.; Helliwell, John R.; Snell, Edward H. (2010). Macromolecular Crystallization and Crystal Perfection. Oxford: Oxford University Press. doi:10.1093/acprof:oso/9780199213252.001.0001. ISBN 9780199213252.
- Helliwell, John R. (2015). Perspectives in Crystallography. Boca Raton: CRC Press. ISBN 978-1498732109.
- Helliwell, John R. (2016). Skills for a Scientific Life. Boca Raton: CRC Press. ISBN 978-1498768757.
- Helliwell, John R. (2018). The Whys of a Scientific Life. Boca Raton: CRC Press. ISBN 978-1032338859.
- Helliwell, John R. (2019). The Whats of a Scientific Life. Boca Raton: CRC Press. ISBN 978-1032337852.
- Helliwell, John R. (2021). The Whens and Wheres of a Scientific Life. Boca Raton: CRC Press. ISBN 978-0367489717.
- Helliwell, John R. (2024). The Scientific Truth, the Whole Truth and Nothing But the Truth. Boca Raton: CRC Press, Taylor & Francis Group. ISBN 978-1-032-52139-8.
- Helliwell, John R. (2025). Certifying Central Facility Beamlines for Biological and Chemical Crystallography and Allied Methods. Springer Cham. ISBN 978-3-031-80181-5.
- Helliwell, John R. (2025). Precision and Accuracy in Biological Crystallography, Diffraction, Scattering, Microscopies, and Spectroscopies. Oxford University Press. ISBN 978-0198952824.
