= Sophie E. Jackson =

British biochemist and academic

Sophie Elizabeth Jackson
- Born: Cheshire
- Education: University of Oxford; University of Cambridge; Imperial College London
- Scientific career
- Institutions: University of Cambridge; Harvard University
- Thesis: Studies on subtilisin BPN' and chymotrypsin inhibitor 2 (1991)
- Doctoral advisor: Alan Fersht
- Other academic advisors: Fraser Armstrong; Stuart Schreiber

Sophie Elizabeth Jackson is a British biochemist and Professor of Chemical Biology at the University of Cambridge. Her research considers protein folding and assembly, She is interested in topological knots, molecular complexes and the β barrel protein.

== Early life and education ==
Jackson was born in Cheshire. She studied mathematics, further mathematics, chemistry and physics at A-Level. She was the first in her family to attend university, and chose to study at The Queen's College, Oxford, because it had the most students from Northern England. At the University of Oxford she worked alongside Fraser Armstrong on electron transfer in metalloproteins. She wanted to move to London, and joined Imperial College London to start a doctorate with Alan Fersht. When he moved to the University of Cambridge, she joined him, and studied the chymotrypsin inhibitor 2 (CI2). In Cambridge Jackson developed the first experimental strategies to monitor protein folding. After earning her doctorate, Jackson joined Harvard University as a postdoctoral fellow with Stuart Schreiber.

== Research and career ==
Jackson returned to the University of Cambridge as a Royal Society University Research Fellow. Here she established her own research group working on the molecular mechanisms that underpin protein folding/unfolding. Alongside the folding of proteins, Jackson has investigated how proteins form knots. Unfolded, misfolded and unknotted proteins can be toxic.

Unknotted versions of Ubiquitin carboxy-terminal hydrolase L1 (UCH-L1) are implicated in Parkinson's disease. Jackson and her team took different unknotted and knotted versions of UCH-L1 and monitored the refolding. She observed that knots act to slow the protein folding mechanism, creating a complex landscape that permits the formation of intermediate shapes during the folding processes. She also showed that knots in proteins occur close to the sites that enzymes build; indicating they may be important in the lock-and-key shape. She was made a lecturer in 2000 and a professor in 2017.

== Select publications ==
- Sophie E. Jackson (1 January 1998). "How do small single-domain proteins fold?". Folding & design. 3 (4): R81-91. doi:10.1016/S1359-0278(98)00033-9. ISSN 1359-0278. PMID 9710577. S2CID 1717713. Wikidata Q55067789.
- Sophie E. Jackson; Alan R. Fersht (1 October 1991). "Folding of chymotrypsin inhibitor 2. 1. Evidence for a two-state transition". Biochemistry. 30 (43): 10428–10435. doi:10.1021/BI00107A010. ISSN 0006-2960. PMID 1931967. S2CID 9409985. Wikidata Q34968585.
- Sophie E. Jackson; Marco Moracci; Nadia elMasry; Christopher M. Johnson; Alan R. Fersht (26 October 1993). "Effect of cavity-creating mutations in the hydrophobic core of chymotrypsin inhibitor 2". Biochemistry. 32 (42): 11259–69. doi:10.1021/BI00093A001. ISSN 0006-2960. PMID 8218191. Wikidata Q27731428.
