= Society of Biological Inorganic Chemistry =

The Society of Biological Inorganic Chemistry is a learned society established to advance research and education in the field of biological inorganic chemistry. It holds training courses, workshops and conferences to facilitate exchange of information between scientists involved in the research and teaching of biological inorganic chemistry. It has an official journal, the Journal of Biological Inorganic Chemistry.

The society was founded in 1995, following discussions within the Steering Committee of the European Science Foundation program "The Chemistry of Metals in Biological Systems". The first president was C. David Garner (1995–1998). Later presidents were Elizabeth C. Theil (1998–2000), Alfred X. Trautwein (2000–2002), Harry B. Gray(2002–2004), Fraser Armstrong (2004–2006), and Jose J. G. Moura (2010–2012).
