= Jens Högbom =

Swedish ice hockey player (born 1995)

- Born: March 1, 1995 (age 31) Umeå, Sweden
- Height: 6 ft 2 in (188 cm)
- Weight: 192 lb (87 kg; 13 st 10 lb)
- Position: Defence
- Shot: Left
- Played for: Tegs SK Hockey; Luleå HF; Vännäs HC; Asplöven HC; Mariestad BoIS HC
- NHL draft: Undrafted
- Playing career: 2014–2022

Jens Högbom (born March 1, 1995) is a Swedish ice hockey defenceman. He is currently playing with Luleå HF of the Swedish Hockey League (SHL).

Högbom made his Swedish Hockey League debut playing with Luleå HF during the 2013–14 season.

== Career statistics ==
			Regular season					Playoffs
Season	Team	League	GP	G	A	Pts	PIM	GP	G	A	Pts	PIM
2009–10	Tegs SK Hockey J18	J18 Elit	28	5	4	9	2	—	—	—	—	—
2009–10	Tegs SK Hockey	Division 2	1	0	0	0	2	—	—	—	—	—
2010–11	IF Björklöven U16	U16 SM	3	1	1	2	4	—	—	—	—	—
2010–11	IF Björklöven J18	J18 Elit	20	3	0	3	10	—	—	—	—	—
2010–11	IF Björklöven J18	J18 Allsvenskan	9	0	0	0	0	—	—	—	—	—
2010–11	IF Björklöven J20	J20 SuperElit	1	0	1	1	2	—	—	—	—	—
2011–12	Luleå HF J18	J18 Elit	22	2	8	10	2	—	—	—	—	—
2011–12	Luleå HF J18	J18 Allsvenskan	11	1	0	1	0	4	0	1	1	2
2011–12	Luleå HF J20	J20 SuperElit	13	0	3	3	2	1	0	0	0	0
2012–13	Luleå HF J18	J18 Elit	2	1	2	3	2	—	—	—	—	—
2012–13	Luleå HF J18	J18 Allsvenskan	3	0	2	2	2	—	—	—	—	—
2012–13	Luleå HF J20	J20 SuperElit	44	4	6	10	24	4	0	0	0	0
2013–14	Luleå HF J20	J20 SuperElit	45	7	11	18	20	—	—	—	—	—
2013–14	Luleå HF	SHL	1	0	0	0	2	1	0	0	0	0
2013–14	Vännäs HC	Hockeyettan	3	0	0	0	0	—	—	—	—	—
2014–15	Luleå HF J20	J20 SuperElit	28	1	7	8	12	3	0	0	0	0
2014–15	Luleå HF	SHL	5	0	0	0	0	—	—	—	—	—
2014–15	Asplöven HC	HockeyAllsvenskan	24	0	0	0	4	—	—	—	—	—
2015–16	Mariestad BoIS HC	Hockeyettan	36	2	6	8	8	—	—	—	—	—
2015–16	Borås HC	Division 2	—	—	—	—	—	—	—	—	—	—
2016–17	Mariestad BoIS HC	Hockeyettan	39	1	9	10	12	6	0	0	0	2
2017–18	Mariestad BoIS HC	Hockeyettan	36	1	2	3	14	6	0	1	1	4
2018–19	Mariestad BoIS HC	Hockeyettan	37	4	7	11	20	3	0	1	1	0
2021–22	Töreboda HF	Division 2	17	2	2	4	2	—	—	—	—	—
AHL totals			6	0	0	0	2	1	0	0	0	0
HockeyAllsvenskan totals			24	0	0	0	4	—	—	—	—	—
Hockeyettan totals			151	8	24	32	54	15	0	2	2	6
