= Metallopharmaceutical =

Drug that contains a metal as an active ingredient

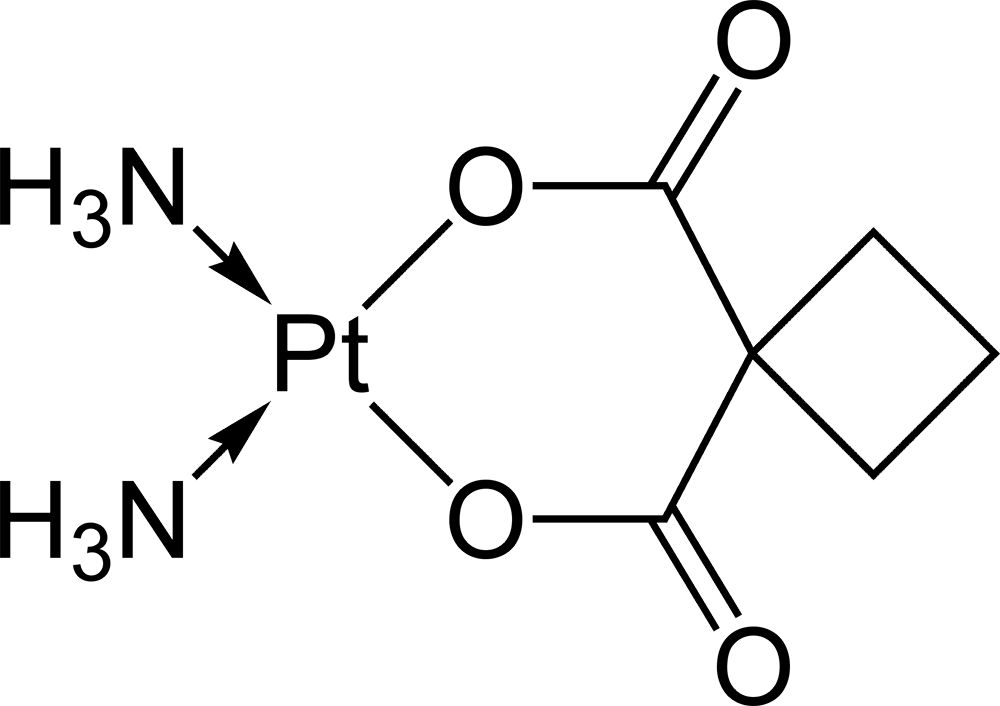
Carboplatin, an example of a metallopharmaceutical

A metallopharmaceutical is a drug that contains a metal as an active ingredient. Most commonly metallopharmaceuticals are used as anticancer or antimicrobial agents. The efficiency of metallopharmaceuticals is crucially dependent on the respective trace metal binding forms.

Examples of metallopharmaceuticals include:

- bismuth subsalicylate and bismuth subcitrate - gut selective antibiotic drugs useful for treating antibiotic-resistant H. pylori
- cisplatin and carboplatin – platinum containing anticancer agents
- gold salts such as auranofin – anti-inflammatory for treatment of arthritis
- silver sulfadiazine – topical antibiotic
- zinc pyrithione – antibacterial and antifungal
