= Raymond Le Fèvre =

Organic chemist (1905–1986)

Professor Raymond Le Fèvre FRS FAA FRACI

Professor of Chemistry, University of Sydney
- In office 1946–1970

Personal details
- Born: Raymond James Wood Le Fèvre; 1 April 1905 London, England
- Died: 26 August 1986 (aged 81)

Raymond James Wood Le Fèvre (1 April 1905 - 26 August 1986) was professor of chemistry at the University of Sydney from 1946 until his retirement in 1970. He was elected a Fellow of the Royal Australian Chemical Institute in 1946, a Foundation Fellow of the Australian Academy of Science in 1954, and a Fellow of the Royal Society in 1959. The University of Sydney awarded him an honorary D.Sc. in 1985.

Le Fèvre was born in London, and studied chemistry at Queen Mary College, University of London (B.Sc., 1925; M.Sc., 1927; Ph.D., 1929; D.Sc., 1935) where he was a lecturer (1928–38) and reader (1938–46). He married in 1931, his wife also being a chemistry researcher who became a D.Sc. in 1960. From 1941 to 1944 he spent World War II as an RAF officer in Malaya, Australia and New Guinea before returning to England. He and his family migrated to Sydney in 1946 where he took up an appointment as professor of chemistry at the University of Sydney.
