= Royal Australian Chemical Institute =

Chemistry society in Australia

Royal Australian Chemical Institute (RACI)
- Abbreviation: RACI
- Formation: 14 August 1917
- Type: Professional association
- Legal status: Incorporated under Royal Charter
- Headquarters: Melbourne, Australia
- Region served: Australia
- Website: raci.org.au

Royal Australian Chemical Institute (RACI) is one of the peak professional bodies for the chemical sciences in Australia. Established in 1917 and granted a Royal Charter in 1932, RACI promotes excellence in the chemical sciences through education, advocacy, professional development, and community engagement.

== History ==
RACI was founded on 14 August 1917 as the Australian Chemical Institute, during a period when the importance of chemistry in national development was increasingly recognised. The organisation was spearheaded by Professor David Masson and emerged amidst the backdrop of World War I, reflecting the growing need for scientific expertise in industry and public policy.

In 1932, the Institute was incorporated under a Royal Charter, and in 1953, the name was officially changed to the Royal Australian Chemical Institute. This royal recognition affirmed RACI’s role in promoting excellence in chemical sciences and its contribution to Australia’s scientific progress.

Throughout its history, RACI has championed chemical education, including the International Chemistry Quiz, which now reaches students in over 20 countries. It has also played a key role in accrediting university chemistry programs, ensuring high standards in tertiary education.

== Membership ==
RACI offers a range of membership categories tailored to different stages of a chemist’s career:

- Student Membership.
- Early Career Membership.
- Member (MRACI).
- Chartered Member (MRACI CChem).
- Fellow (FRACI or FRACI CChem).
- Honorary (FRACI or FRACI CChem).

Some direct membership benefits include access to a range of conferences, webinars, workshops, discounted event rates, eligibility for awards, networking and volunteering opportunities, and the use of professional post-nominals.

RACI members also gain access to MyRACI, Australia’s largest online community for chemical sciences. This platform enables members to connect, collaborate, and stay informed about research, events, careers, and educational opportunities.

== Divisions ==
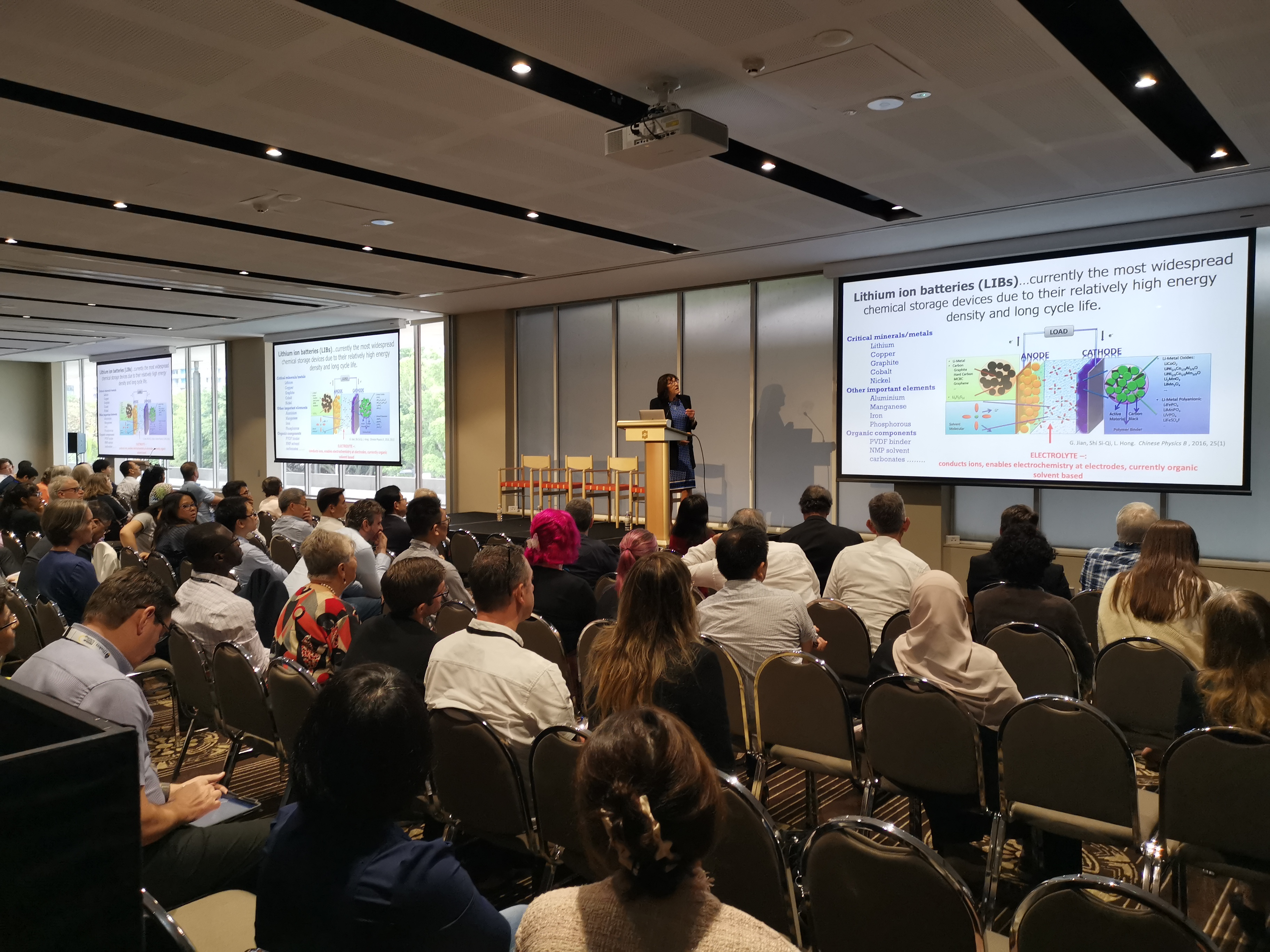
RACI Green & Sustainable Chemistry Conference in 2023

RACI comprises 15 specialist divisions focused on key areas of chemical science:

- Analytical and Environmental Chemistry
- Carbon Chemistry
- Chemical Education
- Electrochemistry
- Health, Safety & Environment
- Industrial Chemistry
- Inorganic Chemistry
- Materials Chemistry
- Medicinal Chemistry & Chemical Biology
- Organic Chemistry
- Physical Chemistry
- Polymer Chemistry
- Radiochemistry
- Supramolecular Chemistry
- Green & Sustainable Chemistry

== Branches ==
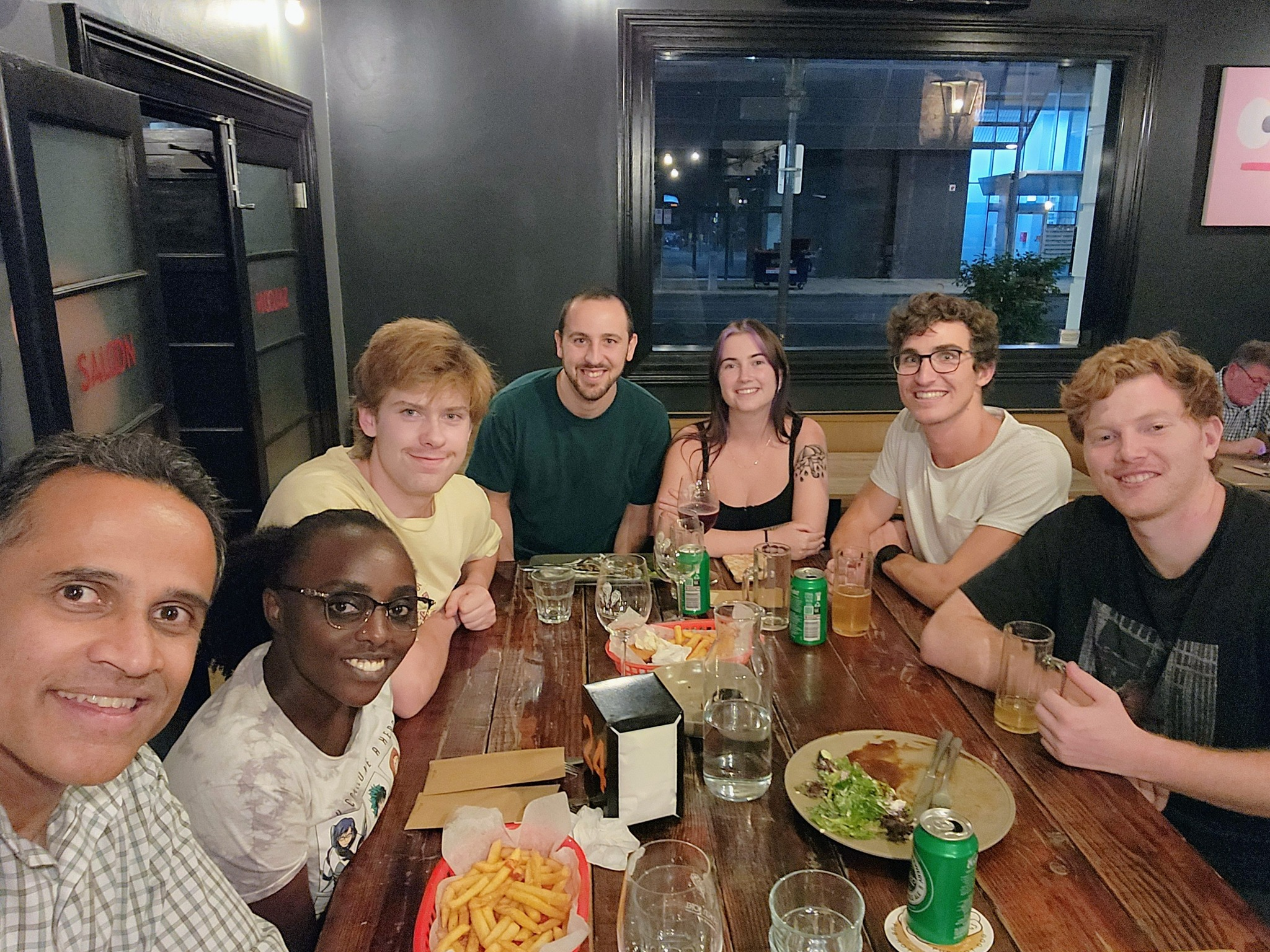
RACI Early Career Chemists Group SA

RACI maintains branches in every Australian state and territory:

- Australian Capital Territory
- New South Wales
- Northern Territory
- Queensland
- South Australia
- Tasmania
- Victoria
- Western Australia

Branches host educational activities, networking events, and outreach programs tailored to local communities.

== Activities and Services ==
RACI delivers a broad range of services and initiatives across four key areas:

=== Education, Careers and Outreach ===
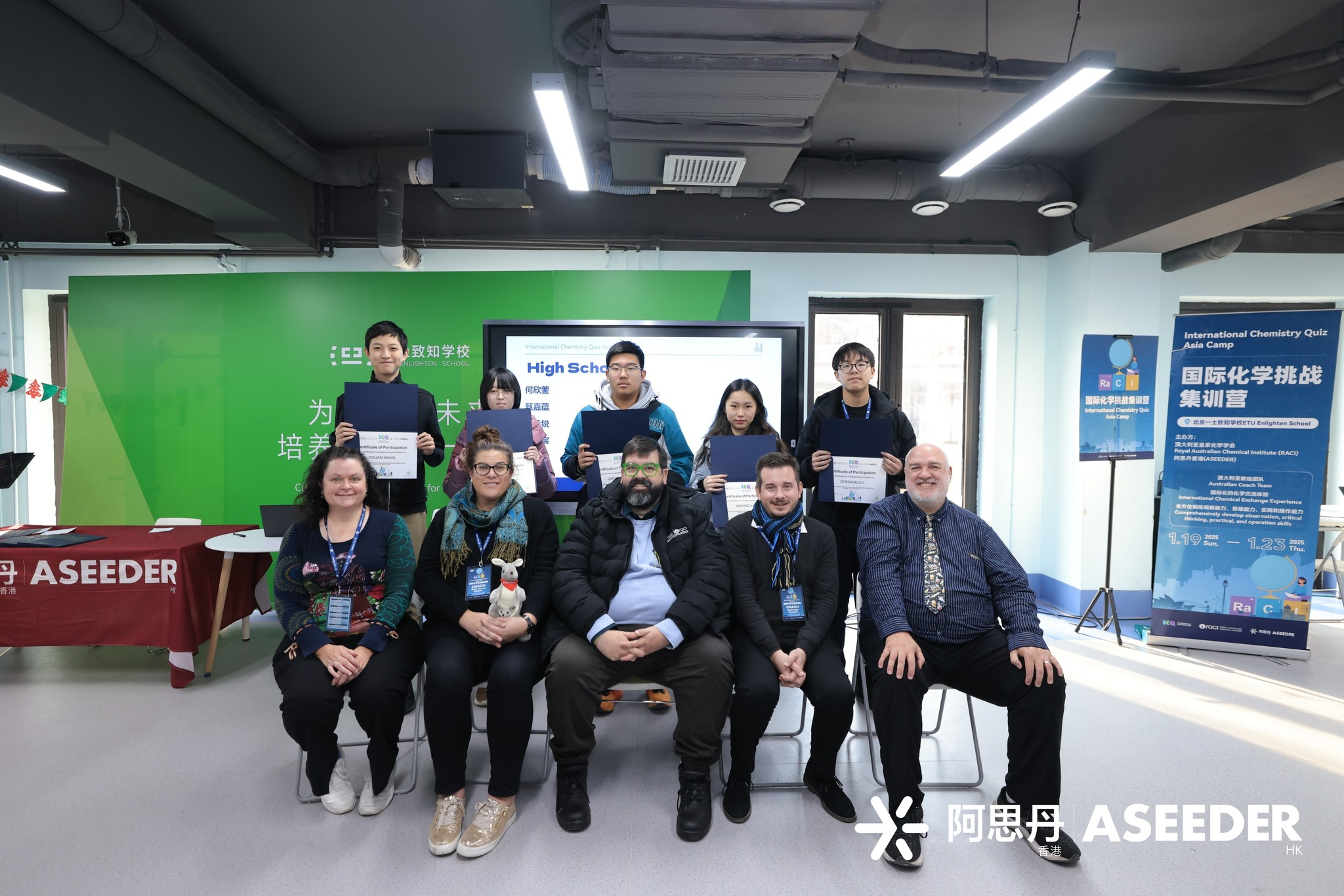
ICQ Global Chemistry Educators Program partnered with ASDAN China

RACI supports chemistry education through competitions, resources, and university accreditation. Outreach initiatives promote scientific literacy and inspire future chemists.

=== Events and Awards ===
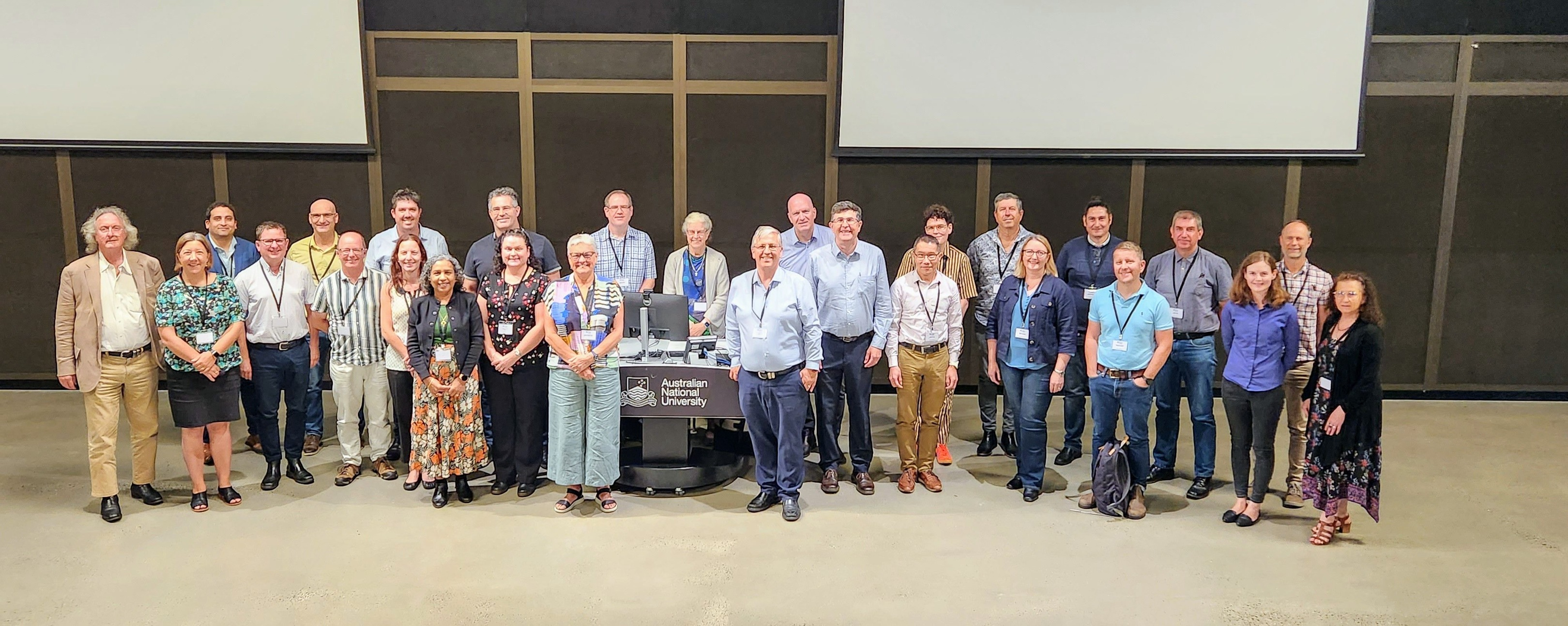
RACI Heads of Chemistry meeting

RACI organises conferences and symposia, and recognises excellence through awards aimed at celebrating outstanding achievements.

=== Publications ===
RACI co-owns a number of international scientific journals, publishes newsletters, and curated reading lists to support professional development and highlight research achievements.

=== Advocacy ===
RACI advocates for the role of chemistry in addressing societal challenges and regularly participates in various national and international forums.

== See also ==
- Australian Journal of Chemistry

== Sources ==
- Le Fèvre, R.J.W. (1961). The Establishment of Chemistry within Australian Science (PDF). The Royal Society of New South Wales.
