= Journal of Biological Inorganic Chemistry =

- Discipline: Life sciences, chemistry
- Language: English
- Edited by: Nils Metzler-Nolte

Publication details
- History: 1996-present
- Publisher: Springer Science+Business Media
- Frequency: 8/year
- Impact factor: 3.0 (2022)

Standard abbreviations
- ISO 4: J. Biol. Inorg. Chem.

Indexing
- CODEN: JJBCFA
- ISSN: 0949-8257 (print); 1432-1327 (web)
- OCLC no.: 36118565

Links
- Journal homepage

Journal of Biological Inorganic Chemistry (JBIC) is a peer-reviewed scientific journal. It is an official publication of the Society of Biological Inorganic Chemistry and published by Springer Science+Business Media.

Biological inorganic chemistry is a growing field of science that embraces the principles of biology and inorganic chemistry and impacts other fields ranging from medicine to the environment. JBIC seeks to promote this field internationally. The journal is primarily concerned with advances in understanding the role of metal ions within a biological matrix—be it a protein, DNA/RNA, or a cell, as well as appropriate model studies. Manuscripts describing high-quality original research on the above topics in English are invited for submission to this journal. The journal publishes original articles, minireviews, perspective articles, protocols, and commentaries on debated issues.

== Scope of the journal ==
Areas of research covered in the journal include: advances in the understanding of systems involving one or more metal ions set in a biological matrix - particularly metalloproteins and metal-nucleic acid complexes - in order to understand biological function at the molecular level. Synthetic analogues mimicking function, structure and spectroscopy of naturally occurring biological molecules are also covered.

The journal is abstracted/indexed in Chemical Abstracts Service, Current Contents/Life Sciences, PubMed/MEDLINE, and the Science Citation Index.

Indexed by ISI Journal of Biological Inorganic Chemistry received an impact factor of 2.538 as reported in the 2014 Journal Citation Reports by Thomson Reuters, ranking it 157 out of 289 journals in the category Biochemistry & Molecular Biology and ranking it 9th out of 44 journals in the category Chemistry, Inorganic & Nuclear.

== Editor in chief ==
The current editor in chief of JBIC is Nils Metzler-Nolte (Ruhr University Bochum). He followed Lawrence Que (University of Minnesota) who led the journal from 1999 to 2020 and who succeeded Ivano Bertini (University of Florence) who was the founding editor of JBIC.
