= Keith Hodgson =

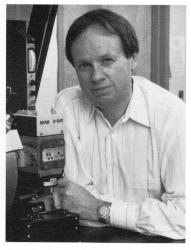
Keith O. Hodgson.

Keith O. Hodgson (born 1947 in Virginia) is a professor of chemistry at Stanford University and formerly director of the Stanford Synchrotron Radiation Lightsource.

== Education ==
He received his B.S. in 1969 from the University of Virginia and his Ph.D. in 1972 from University of California at Berkeley.

== Research ==
He joined Stanford's chemistry department in 1973 and then he became a full-time chemistry professor in 1984. His principal research interests include inorganic, bioinorganic, structural and biophysical chemistry. His research group focuses on questions relating to how structure at different organizational levels relates to function. His research is done using a number of different x-ray spectroscopic and scattering techniques such as x-ray absorption spectroscopy (XAS).

One of his main area of focus is the active site of the enzyme nitrogenase, which is responsible for conversion of atmospheric dinitrogen to ammonia. Using XAS studies at the S, Fe and Mo edge, his group has worked to understand the electronic structure as a function of redox in this cluster. Other projects include the study of iron in dioxygen activation and oxidation and the role of copper in electron transport and in dioxygen activation.

Over his career he has earned the following awards: NATO Postdoctoral Fellow, E.T.H. (Zurich) 1972-73, Alfred P. Sloan Foundation Fellow, 1976–78; Sidhu Award for Contributions to X-ray Diffraction, 1978; World Bank Lecturer, 1984, and the Ernest Orlando Lawrence Award in 2002.

Keith Hodgson was previously the Deputy Director of the Synchrotron Division of the Stanford Linear Accelerator Center and Professor of Chemistry and SSRL. Hodgson and his students began work at SSRL in 1974 where they quickly made important fundamental discoveries in the utilization of synchrotron x-rays for studies of chemical and biological structure. He became the Division Director on July 1, 1998.
