= List of chemistry societies =

The following is a list of chemistry societies:

== A ==
- Alpha Chi Sigma (ΑΧΣ)
- American Association for Clinical Chemistry
- American Chemical Society
- American Crystallographic Association
- American Institute of Chemical Engineers (AIChE)
- American Institute of Chemists(AIC)
- American Oil Chemists' Society
- American Society of Brewing Chemists
- American Society for Mass Spectrometry
- Association of Analytical Communities (AOAC International)
- Association of Greek Chemists

== B ==
- Belgian Society of Biochemistry and Molecular Biology
- Biochemical Society
- Brazilian Chemical Society

== C ==
- Canadian Society for Chemical Technology (CSCT)
- Canadian Society of Clinical Chemists - (CSCC)
- Chemical Abstracts Service (CAS)
- Chemical Heritage Foundation (CHF), now the Science History Institute
- Chemical Institute of Canada (CIC)
- Chemical Society Located in Taipei (CSLT)
- Chemical Society of Japan (CSJ)
- Crystallographic Society of Japan (CSJ)
- Chemical Society of Pakistan
- Chemical Society of Peru
- Chinese-American Chemical Society
- Chinese Chemical Society (Beijing) (CCS)
- Chinese Chemical Society (Taipei) (CSLT)
- Council for Chemical Research (CCR)
- Chemical Research Society of India

== D ==
- Danish Chemical Society

== E ==
- The Electrochemical Society
- European Association for Chemical and Molecular Sciences

== F ==
- Faraday Society
- Federation of European Biochemical Societies

== G ==
- Gesellschaft Deutscher Chemiker (GDCh)

== H ==
- Hungarian Chemical Society

== I ==
- Indian Chemical Society
- Institute of Chemistry, Ceylon (Sri Lanka)
- Institute of Chemistry of Ireland
- Institution of Chemical Engineers (IChemE)
- International Federation of Societies of Cosmetic Chemists
- International Mass Spectrometry Foundation
- International Union of Crystallography
- International Union of Pure and Applied Chemistry (IUPAC)
- Iota Sigma Pi
- Italian Chemical Society(SCI)

== J ==
- Japan Association for International Chemical Information
- Journal of the Chemical Society of Pakistan

== K ==
- The Korean Chemical Society
- Korean Society for Biochemistry and Molecular Biology

== L ==
- Lithuanian Chemical Society

== N ==
- National Organization for the Professional Advancement of Black Chemists and Chemical Engineers
- New Zealand Institute of Chemistry
- Chemical Society of Nigeria (CSN)
- Norwegian Chemical Society

== P ==
- Pan Africa Chemistry Network
- Pancyprian Union of Chemists
- Polish Chemical Society
- The Institute of Chemists PNG

== R ==
- Royal Australian Chemical Institute (RACI)
- Royal Flemish Chemical Society (KVCV)
- Royal Netherlands Chemical Society (KNCV)
- Royal Society of Chemistry (RSC)

== S ==
- Société Royale de Chimie Belgique
- Société Chimique de France
- Society of Chemical Industry (SCI)
- Society of Chemical Industry (American Section)
- Society of Chemical Manufacturers and Affiliates
- Society of Cosmetic Chemists
- Swedish Chemical Society

== W ==
- World Association of Theoretical and Computational Chemists
