= Chartered Physicist =

Professional qualification

Chartered Physicist (CPhys) is a chartered status and a professional qualification for physicists awarded by the Institute of Physics. It is denoted by the postnominals "CPhys".

== Description ==
Achieving chartered status in any profession denotes to the wider community a high level of specialised subject knowledge and professional competence. According to the Institute of Physics, holders of the award of the Chartered Physicist (CPhys) demonstrate the "highest standards of professionalism, up-to-date expertise, quality and safety" along with "the capacity to undertake independent practice and exercise leadership" as well as "commitment to keep pace with advancing knowledge and with the increasing expectations and requirements for which any profession must take responsibility".

The status of Chartered Physicist was introduced in 1985 following approval from the Privy Council. It was originally granted automatically with corporate membership of the Institute of Physics (IoP). Reform of the membership structure in 1998 saw Chartered Physicist established as a separate qualification from 2001 that could be gained either alongside or after the status of Member or Fellow of the IoP. In order to gain the qualification, a physicist must be appropriately qualified (an accredited MSci or MPhys integrated master's degree is standard, although experience leading to an equivalent level can be counted), have had a minimum of two years of structured training and a minimum of two years responsible work experience, have demonstrated a commitment to continuing professional development, and have gained a number of competencies. For physicists gaining the status from 2012, revalidation through proof of continuing professional development is required every three years.

Chartered Physicist is considered to be equal in status to Chartered Engineer, which the IoP also awards as a member of the Engineering Council UK, and other chartered statuses in the UK. It is also considered a "regulated profession" under the European professional qualification directives.

== See also ==
- Chartered Engineer
- Chartered Scientist
- Chartered Chemist
- European Engineer
- European Chemist
