= Shoji Nishikawa =

Japanese crystallographer (1884-1952)

Shōji Nishikawa (Japanese: 西川 正治, Nishikawa Shōji, 5 December 1884 – 5 January 1952) was a Japanese physicist and a founding father of crystallography in Japan.

== Education and career ==
Nishikawa was born in 1884 in Hachiōji, Tokyo Prefecture, as the son of an important silk dealer. He grew up in Tokyo and later studied at the Faculty of Science at the Imperial University of Tokyo (now University of Tokyo). His PhD in physics was supervised by Suekichi Kinoshita, with an initial focus on radioactivity. During this time, Nishikawa was inspired by Torahiko Terada to turn his interest turned to crystallography, which was experiencing a worldwide boom with the then new method of X-ray diffraction for structural analysis. The first publications of Nishikawa came out between 1913 and 1915, at a time when the British Nobel Prize winners in physics William Henry Bragg and William Lawrence Bragg were doing groundbreaking pioneering work in this field. Between 1916 and 1919, Nishikawa stayed in the United States and worked at Cornell University, where he was a mentor of the then graduate student Ralph Wyckoff. Before returning to Japan in 1920, Nishikawa also spent six months with William H. Bragg at University College London. Back in Japan, he led the first research group at the Institute of Physical and Chemical Research (now known as RIKEN) and worked there until 1949. In 1924, Nishikawa became a professor at the University of Tokyo, where he worked until his retirement in 1945.

Nishikawa pioneered in the application of space groups in crystal structure determination, using spinel compounds as examples. His other significant scientific contributions include the analysis of the phase transformation of quartz and the experimental evidence of deviations from Friedel's law for certain crystal structures. In 1950, Nishikawa co-founded the Crystallographic Society of Japan and became its first president until his death two years later. One of Nishikawa's students was Seishi Kikuchi, who in 1928 described the Kikuchi lines that appear in electron diffraction and were named after him.

Nishikawa was elected into the Japan Academy in 1937. He received the Japanese Order of Culture in 1951 and was recognized as an honorary citizen of Hachiōji, where he was born.

== Personal life ==
Nishikawa was married to a teacher named Kiku Ayai and they had four sons and a daughter. Both of his two sons later became physicists. The first son, Tetsuji Nishikawa (1926–2010), was one of the founding fathers of The High Energy Accelerator Research Organization (also known as KEK) and was its general director from 1977 to 1989. A younger son, Kyōji Nishikawa (born 1934), is an emeritus professor at the Hiroshima University specialized in nuclear fusion and plasma science. Nishikawa died of apoplexy at his home on January 5, 1952.
