= Babafemi =

Babafemi is a given name. It may refer to:

- Oluwole Babafemi Familoni (born 1957), Nigerian university professor
- Babafemi Ogundipe (1924–1971), Nigerian politician
- Babafemi Ojudu (born 1961), Nigerian journalist and politician
