= College of Chemical Sciences =

Institute in Sri Lanka

The College of Chemical Sciences is an institute in Sri Lanka. It was established 25 January 2001 during the Diamond Jubilee celebration of the Institute of Chemistry Ceylon.

As per by law 15 of the Institute of Chemistry Ceylon, the College of Chemical Sciences was established to conduct all the educational and training activities of the institute. A statutory committee known as the academic board of the College of Chemical Sciences is appointed annually to promote, conduct and co-ordinate all the education, training and academic affairs of the College of Chemical Sciences. all the formal educational programmes are the immediate responsibility of this board, which is headed by the chairman and includes 14 members, a deputy chairman, a secretary for educational affairs, and an assistant secretary. Additionally, the president of the institute, one of the honorary joint secretaries of the institute, the chairman of the Admissions & Ethical Practices Committee of the institute, and the institute's honorary treasurer are ex officio members of the academic board.

The chief executive officer of the board is the dean appointed by the council. Full-time academic staff members and teaching assistants constitute the academic staff, while the administrative staff is headed by the registrar of the college. An assistant librarian is in charge of the library. A number of other full-time non academic staff comprise the balance staff. A number of visiting academics and teaching assistants drawn from universities, research institutes, and service organisations and well as the private sector carry out the day-to-day teaching activities of the college.

== Functions of the college ==
- to conduct post-secondary, graduateship, diploma and certificate courses in the chemical sciences
- to promote education in and application of chemistry at levels
- to initiate research activities in collaboration with universities, industry and foreign institutions
- to establish library facilities, including database access and technology information
- to conduct refresher/in-service/training courses for scientists and teachers
- to assist industry in product development, problem solving, quality improvement, and product diversification
- to encourage staff exchange between the college and the universities/research institutes in Sri Lanka and overseas
- to publish journals/monographs etc. to disseminate the latest know-how in the chemical sciences
- to take any measures that may be necessary for the attainment of the educational goals of the institute

== List of college officers ==
- Hony. dean, College of Chemical Sciences and chairman – academic board: Prof J N Oleap Fernando, C.Chem. (Chartered Chemist), C.Sci.
- Vice-chairman, academic board: Prof. G M K B Gunaherath, C.Chem. (Chartered Chemist)
- Secretary for educational affairs: Ms. P M Jayasinha, C.Chem. (Chartered Chemist)
- Asst. secretary for educational affairs: Ms. M N K de S Goonatillake, C.Chem. (Chartered Chemist)
- Course co-ordinator (Kandy): Dr (Ms) A D L C Perera, C.Chem.
- Academic laboratory co-ordinator: Mr. M R M Haniffa, C.Chem. (Chartered Chemist)
- Visiting professor: Prof. S Sotheeswaran, D.Sc. (Hull), C.Chem. (Chartered Chemist)
- Full-time lecturers: Dr U S K Weliwegamage, C.Chem., Dr. (Ms.) V M Thadhani
- Registrar and registrar/College of Chemical Sciences: Mr. N I N S Nadarasa, C.Chem. (Chartered Chemist)
- Deputy registrar/DLTC co-ordinator: Mr J M Ranasinghe Banda, C.Chem. (Chartered Chemist)
- Asst. librarian/College of Chemical Sciences: Mr K G B Wimalasena
