= Chemical Society of Japan =

Japanese learned society and professional association

- Formation: 1878
- Type: Learned society
- Headquarters: Tokyo
- Location: Japan
- Official language: Japanese
- President: Keiji Maruoka
- Website: http://www.csj.jp/index-e.html

The Chemical Society of Japan (公益社団法人 日本化学会, Kōeki Shadanhōjin Nihon Kagakukai) (CSJ) is a learned society and professional association founded in 1878 in order to advance research in chemistry. The mission of the CSJ is to promote chemistry for science and industry in collaboration with other domestic and global societies.

== History ==
The organization was modeled after the British Chemical Society. This learned society in London was the precursor of the Royal Society of Chemistry. Like its British counterpart, the Japanese association sought to foster the communication of new ideas and facts throughout Japan and across international borders.

Membership was expanded in 1948 in a merger with the Society of Chemical Industry. In 2018, the first woman was announced as president, the distinguished chemist Maki Kawai.

== Activities ==
Support for the Bulletin of the Chemical Society of Japan (BCSJ) began in 1926. Other publications of the society include:

- Bioscience, Biotechnology, and Biochemistry
- Chemistry Letters

=== Annual meeting ===
The society holds an annual meeting in March, every year.

- The 102nd CSJ Annual Meeting is held on March 23 to March 26, 2022 at the Nishinomiya Uegahara campus of Kwansei Gakuin University.
- The 101st CSJ Annual Meeting was virtually held on March 19 to March 21, 2021.

=== Chemistry & Chemical Industry ===
The society publishes "Chemistry & Chemical Industry" every month in a printed form, which is sent to the members of the society. The digital form of "Chemistry & Chemical Industry" is uploaded in the website of the society, and any member of the society can access the digital form.

== See also ==
- List of chemistry societies
- Royal Society of Chemistry, 1841
- Société Chimique de France, 1857
- Deutsch Chemische Gesellschaft, 1867
- American Chemical Society, 1876
- Japan Association for International Chemical Information, 1971
- Crystallographic Society of Japan
