= Floris Rutjes =

Dutch organic chemist

Floris Rutjes MAE
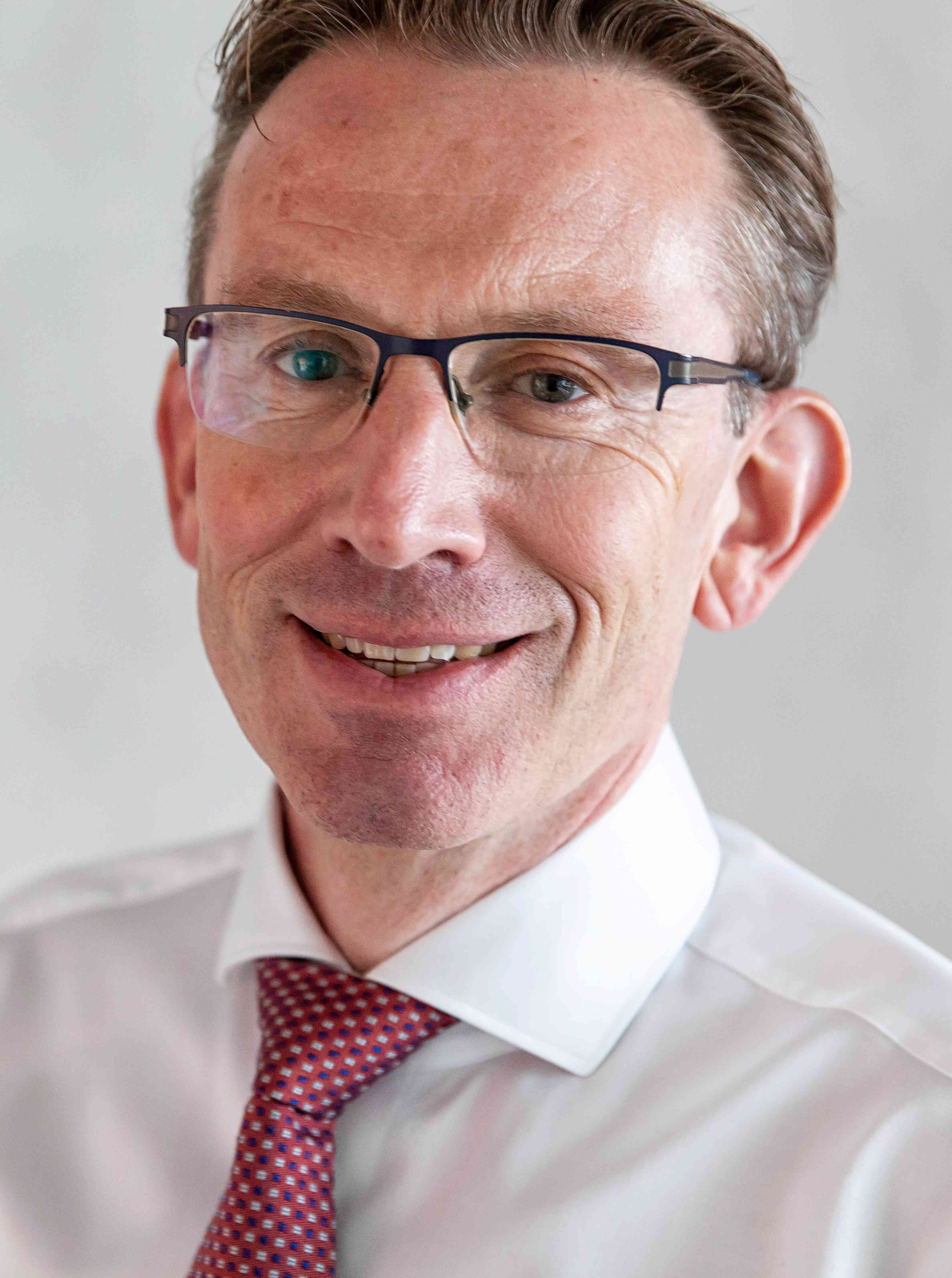
- Born: Floris Petrus Johannes Theodoris
- Education: University of Amsterdam
- Known for: Synthetic organic chemistry, catalysis, sustainable chemistry
- Awards: Knight of the Order of the Netherlands Lion (2020)
- Scientific career
- Fields: Organic chemistry
- Workplaces: Radboud University; University of Amsterdam

Floris Rutjes is a Dutch organic chemist and academic. He is a professor and Chair of Synthetic Organic Chemistry at Radboud University. Rutjes has served as President of the European Chemical Society (EuChemS) and of the Royal Netherlands Chemical Society (KNCV), and his research focuses on synthetic organic chemistry, catalysis, and sustainable chemical processes.

== Early life and education ==
Rutjes obtained his MSc (cum laude) in organic chemistry from the University of Amsterdam in 1988. He completed his PhD at the same institution in 1993. From 1993 to 1995, he carried out postdoctoral research with K. C. Nicolaou at The Scripps Research Institute in La Jolla, California.

== Academic career ==
In 1995, Rutjes joined the University of Amsterdam as an assistant professor. He was appointed part-time professor of combinatorial synthesis in 1999 and later became full professor and Chair of Synthetic Organic Chemistry at Radboud University in the same year.

Rutjes served as President of the European Chemical Society from 2021 to 2024 and as President of the Royal Netherlands Chemical Society from 2016 to 2019.

He served as Director of the Institute for Molecules and Materials (IMM) at Radboud University from 2019 to 2025.

== Research ==
Rutjes’s research is in synthetic organic chemistry, with a focus on the development of catalytic and sustainable synthetic methodologies. His work addresses the synthesis of complex organic molecules and the design of efficient and selective catalytic processes, including multistep synthesis in continuous-flow systems.

A significant component of his research involves the design and synthesis of biologically active small molecules, with applications in medicinal chemistry and chemical biology. In this context, Rutjes has worked on click-chemistry–based approaches and related methods for bioorthogonal conjugation, enabling the selective chemical modification of biomolecules.

Rutjes has also contributed to research on continuous-flow synthesis using microreactor systems, particularly for catalytic and multistep transformations, with the aim of improving reaction control, efficiency, and scalability compared with traditional batch processes.

== Awards and honours ==
- Gold Medal, Royal Netherlands Chemical Society (2002)
- AstraZeneca Award for Research in Organic Chemistry (2003)
- Dutch Research Council TOP Grant (2006)
- Faculty Education Award, Radboud University (2014)
- Knight of the Order of the Netherlands Lion (2020)
- Honorary Fellow, Chemistry Europe (2020–21)
- Member of the Academia Europaea (2022)
- Honorary Member of the Royal Netherlands Chemical Society (2023)
- Fellow of the Netherlands Academy of Engineering (2023)
- Member of the Royal Netherlands Academy of Arts and Sciences (2024)
