= Pechoin =

Skin care brand based in Shanghai, China

Pechoin Co., Ltd.
- Native name: 上海百雀羚日用化学有限公司
- Type: Private
- Industry: Cosmetics
- Founded: 1931; 95 years ago
- Founder: Gu Zhimin (顾植民)
- Headquarters: Shanghai, China
- Products: Cosmetics, perfumes
- Revenue: 17.7 billion RMB (2019)
- Website: http://www.pechoin.com

Pechoin (Chinese: 百雀羚) is a skin care brand under Shanghai Pehchaolin Daily Chemical Co Ltd based in Shanghai, China. Originally founded in 1931, Pechoin is China's first domestic skincare brand. The company manufactures cosmetic products including skincare products and perfumes. It is one of the largest skincare companies in China and a leading Chinese cosmetics brand. In 2013, Pechoin products were recognized as "national gifts (国礼)" of the People's Republic of China.

== History ==
=== Republic of China ===
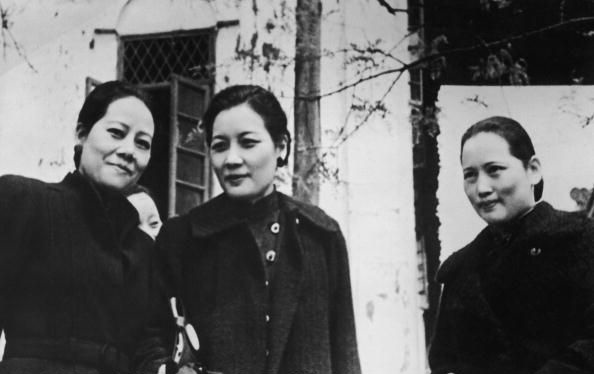
The influential Soong sisters were among the major patrons of Pechoin.

In 1931, Pechoin was founded by Gu Zhimin (顾植民) as a skincare brand under cosmetics company Fu Bei Kang (富贝康化妆品有限公司) in Shanghai, making it the first domestic skincare brand in China. In Chinese, the name "Pechoin" may be interpreted as a hundred birds paying tribute to Fenghuang or the Chinese phoenix. From 1937 to 1945, Pechoin survived the second Sino-Japanese war. And in 1945, it became a top cosmetics brand in China.

The company's skincare products were often contained in an iconic round iron box (painted in blue and yellow). One of Pechoin's main products at the time was its moisturizing balm, which became widely popular in Shanghai and then nationwide.

Notable patrons of Pechoin included the Soong sisters, who then introduced the products to wives of foreign diplomats in China. Leading Chinese actresses and singers such as Hu Die, Ruan Lingyu and Zhou Xuan were also Pechoin's regular customers. Some Pechoin products were further exported to countries in Southeast Asia.

=== People's Republic of China ===
==== Continuation of the old brand ====
In 1949, the People's Republic of China was established and Gu Zhimin chose to stay in Shanghai under the Communist rule. The company later provided its products to the People's Volunteer Army who fought in the Korean war.

In 1956, Pechoin's parent company underwent the socialist transformation and became a state-private jointly owned enterprise (公私合营). In the same year, Gu Zhimin died due to heart attack; his wife Luo Weizhen (罗伟贞) and his son Gu Jiongwei (顾炯为) took charge of the company. Pechoin's annual revenue soon approached 10 million RMB. In 1962, the company was renamed as the Shanghai Second Daily Chemical Factory (上海日用化学二厂).

In the 1960s and the 1970s, the company was impacted by the Chinese Cultural Revolution, when many key figures of the company were persecuted. During the early phase of the Reform and Opening of China, however, Pechoin regained its productivity and was able to manufacture some 40 million units of skincare products per year in the 1980s.

==== Restructuring and rapid growth ====
In the early 1990s, Pechoin suffered poor market performance due to the influx of foreign high-end cosmetic products, and as a result its parent company declared bankruptcy. The brand Pechoin was subsequently acquired by a businessman from Hong Kong with 500,000 RMB.

In 2000, Pechoin restructured into a private company, the Shanghai Pehchaolin Daily Chemical Co Ltd. The company then entered a period of rapid growth and the brand Pechoin was revived. In 2007-08, Pechoin as a brand won the title of Well-known Trademark in China (中国驰名商标). In 2013, Pechoin's products were sent as Chinese "national gifts (国礼)" to national leaders in Africa by China's first lady Peng Liyuan.

From 2013 to 2015, Pechoin saw a 56% annual growth rate and from 2015 to 2017, a 19% annual growth rate. In 2016, the annual revenue of Pechoin reached 13.8 billion RMB, with its market share in mainland China ranking 4th, after foreign brands such as L'Oreal and Olay. In 2019, the estimated annual sales of Pechoin reached 17.7 billion RMB (2.26 billion euros), further expanding its market share to 7.3%, second only to L'Oréal. In 2020, Pechoin formed a strategic partnership with the Merck Group based in Germany.

== Products ==
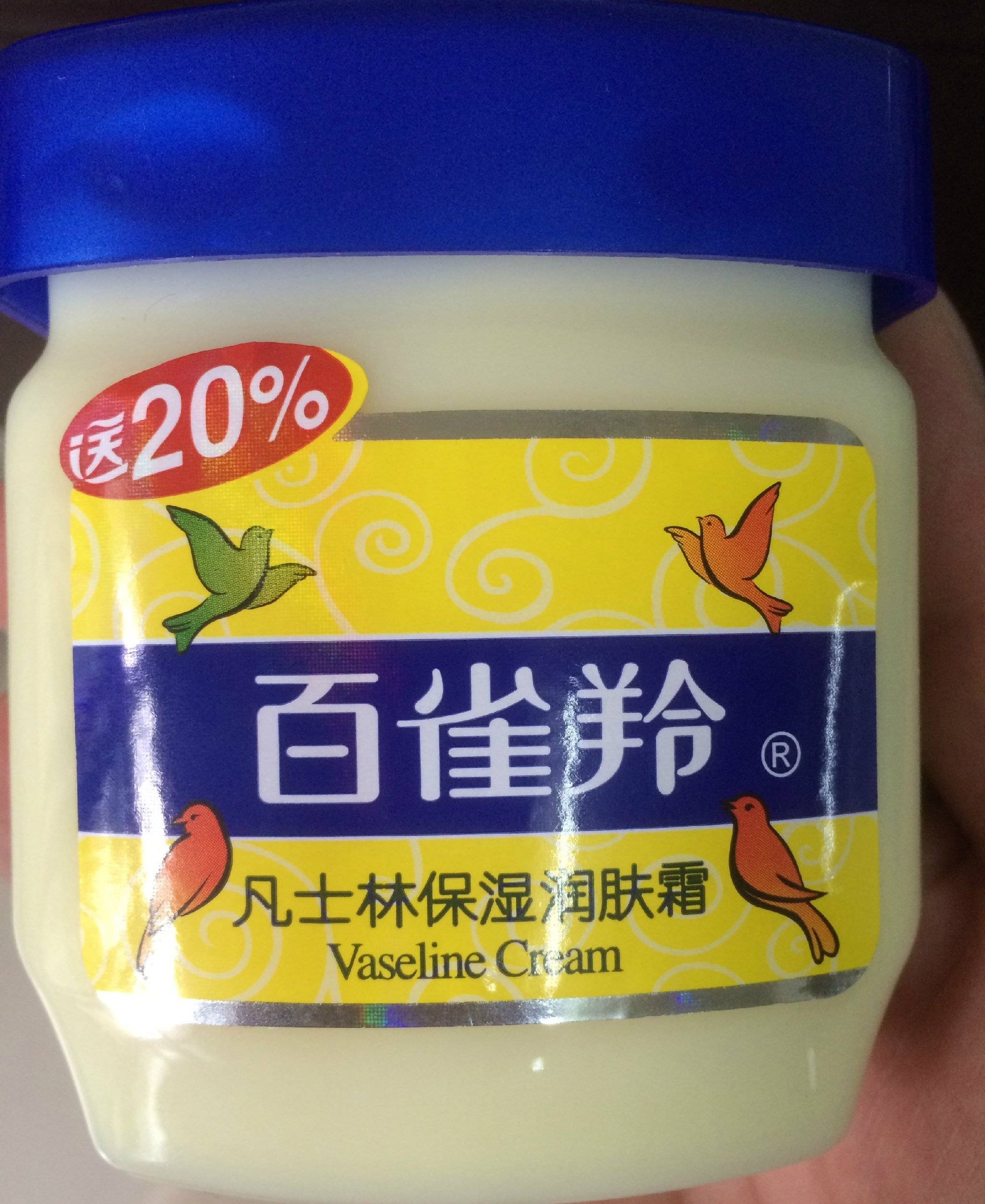
One of Pechoin's modern products.

As of 2023, Pechoin offers products under 8 different categories:

- Pechoin Herbs (百雀羚草本)
- Sansen Skincare (三生花护肤)
- Sansen Nursing (三生花洗护)
- Flavor (气韵)
- Bluemyth (海之秘)
- Lucky Charm (小雀幸)
- Pechoin Men (百雀羚男士)
- Beili (蓓丽)

=== Marketing ===
After 2000, the revived Pechoin tried to appeal to younger population as a fashion brand. In its advertisements, Pechoin started to use more graphical and video content as presentation. In addition, it also publishes advertisements on various digital platforms in order to draw attention of wider audience and increase public awareness. For example, one of its advertisements in 2017 fantasized a story taking place in wartime Shanghai (Republic of China), in which a Chinese woman "Pechoin", who was a special agent, successfully killed her enemy "time/old age", and the company tried to tactfully promote its products through this story. This advertisement reached over 30 million users through WeChat platform, and in the end the total number of views exceeded 100 million. In 2011, the company spent a total of CNY¥150 million on advertising, while this figure increased to ¥380 million in 2014, ¥680 million in 2015, and ¥1 billion in 2016.

From 2012 to 2015, Pechoin co-sponsored the Chinese reality show The Voice of China for four seasons. In 2016, it also sponsored TV series Ice Fantasy, an epic drama hugely popular with Chinese youngsters. When it comes to e-commerce, Pechoin joined the Chinese e-business platform Taobao, for example, which has been called "China's Amazon". Additionally, Singles' Day is the largest online shopping festival in China, and according to published data in 2016, a total number of 4,787,965 customers made purchases with Pechoin on that day, which was the highest daily record for a cosmetics brand; and in 2017, Pechoin's total sales volume on Singles' Day reached a record-breaking 294 million RMB.

== List of spokespeople ==
The following list includes Pechoin's current and past spokespeople.

- Jay Chou
- Wang Yibo
- Greg Hsu
- Dilraba Dilmurat
- Zhou Dongyu
- Li Bingbing
- Fan Bingbing
- Jolin Tsai
- Bai Baihe
- Karen Mok

== Recognition ==
- In 2007–2008, Pechoin won the title of Well-known Trademark in China (中国驰名商标).
- In 2018, during the 30th Congress of the International Federation of Societies of Cosmetic Chemists (IFSCC), Pechoin's scientist Dr. Alexandra Lan was awarded the Innovation Golden Award by the host——German Society for Scientific and Applied Cosmetics (DGK). Pechoin received the Golden Award for its innovative cooling sunscreen to protect Asian skin in the visible and near-infrared spectrum.
- In 2019, during the 25th Conference of the IFSCC, one of Pechoin’s young scientists Dr. Liu Yan was awarded the 2019 Maison G de Navarre Young Scientist Prize. Dr. Liu's paper titled "The Human Skin Microbiome: A New Way to Beauty".
- In 2021, Pechoin's scientist Dr. Zuo JinHui was awarded the 2021 Maison G de Navarre Young Scientist Prize by the IFSCC. Dr. Zuo's paper titled "New anti-aging strategy of cosmetics, from skin physiology to skin 'psychology'."
- In 2023, according to Brand Finance, Pechoin was the highest ranking Asian brand (13th globally) in the list of "Top 50 most valuable cosmetics brands". From 2019 to 2022, Pechoin's global ranking in this list rose steadily from 23rd to 19th, 15th, and to 14th.
