= Seishi Kikuchi =

Japanese physicist

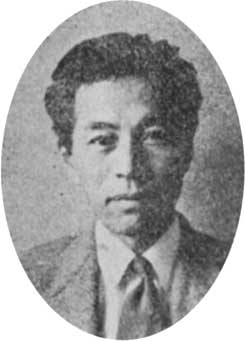
- Born: August 25, 1902; Tokyo
- Died: November 12, 1974 (aged 72)
- Education: Tokyo Imperial University
- Scientific career
- Fields: Physics

Seishi Kikuchi (菊池 正士, Kikuchi Seishi; August 25, 1902 – November 12, 1974) was a Japanese physicist, known for his explanation of the Kikuchi lines that show up in diffraction patterns of diffusely scattered electrons.

Kikuchi's research was recorded in the official Nobel Prize selection meeting minutes of the 1930s.

== Biography ==
Seishi Kikuchi was born and grew up in Tokyo. He graduated in 1926 from Tokyo Imperial University.

In 1928, Kikuchi and Shoji Nishikawa observed and gave a theoretical explanation of the electron backscatter diffraction pattern from a calcite cleavage face. In 1929, he went to Germany as a student and stayed at the University of Göttingen and Leipzig University. In 1934, he was appointed as professor at Osaka Imperial University and directed the construction of Japan's first DC high voltage Cockcroft-Walton accelerator.

In 1955, he was appointed as the first director of the Institute of Nuclear Research at the University of Tokyo, and successfully presided over the completion of the variable energy cyclotron.

Between 1959 and 1964, he was chairman of the Japan Atomic Energy Research Institute.
