= Chemistry Letters =

- Discipline: Chemistry
- Language: English
- Edited by: Mitsuhiko Shionoya

Publication details
- History: 1972-present
- Publisher: Chemical Society of Japan (Japan)
- Frequency: Monthly
- Impact factor: 1.6 (2022)

Standard abbreviations
- ISO 4: Chem. Lett.

Indexing
- CODEN: CMLTAG
- ISSN: 0366-7022
- LCCN: 73644589
- OCLC no.: 801836827

Links
- Journal homepage; Online archive

Chemistry Letters is a peer-reviewed scientific journal published by the Chemical Society of Japan. It specializes in the rapid publication of reviews and letters on all areas of chemistry. The editor-in-chief is Mitsuhiko Shionoya (University of Tokyo). According to the Journal Citation Reports, the journal has a 2014 impact factor of 1.23.
