= Oluwole Babafemi Familoni =

Prof. Oluwole Babafemi Familoni
- Born: Oluwole Babafemi Familoni; 24 November 1957 (age 68)
- Education: University of Lagos
- Occupation: Professor of Organic Chemistry
- Spouse: Bosede Familoni
- Children: Babajide Familoni, Olumuyiwa Familoni, Omolabake Familoni, Olubukola Familoni
- Awards: JWT Jones Travelling Fellowship by Royal Society of Chemistry LONDON in 2007 and 1997; Five-time research awardee in 1993, 1996, 2004, 2006 and 2014 by the Royal Society of Chemistry, London

Oluwole Babafemi Familoni is a professor of Chemistry at the University of Lagos and member of the Governing Council of the Institute of Chartered Chemists of Nigeria. Between 2000 and 2002, he was the Sub-Dean of the Faculty of Science of the University of Lagos. He was appointed the Head of the Department of Chemistry between 2002 and 2005. He later became the dean of science between 2008 and 2012. He is a fellow of the Nigerian Academy of Science, elected into the academy's fellowship at its Annual General Meeting held in January 2015. He is currently the Deputy Vice-Chancellor (Academic and Research) of University of Lagos. Professor Familoni is the International Representative for Royal Society of Chemistry, London for Southern Nigeria.

== Early life ==
Familoni was born on 24 November 1957 to Mr. Gabriel Familoni and Mrs. Alice Familoni of Ido Ekiti in Ido-Osi Local Government Area of Ekiti State. He attended St. John Anglican Primary School in 1963 and ended at St Peters Anglican Primary school in Ikere Ekiti in 1969. He later attended Modern School, Muwoje, Ido Ekiti in 1970. His secondary school was at Ikeigbo/Ifetedo Anglican Grammar School between 1971 and 1975, where he graduated in grade one in West African School Certificate Examination (WASCE). He proceeded to Government College, Ibadan in 1976, where he obtained Higher School Certificate in 1978.

== Professional career ==
He obtained B.Sc. Honours in chemistry in Second Class upper division in 1981, M.Phil. in chemistry, 1986 and Ph.D. in organic chemistry at the University of Lagos in 1990. He was appointed lecturer II in 1990 and full professor in 2004. He is a chartered chemist and a fellow of the Royal Society of Chemistry, London, fellow of the Chemical Society of Nigeria, fellow of the Institute of Chartered Chemists of Nigeria, and member of the Institute of Public Analysts of Nigeria.

== Research specialization ==
Familoni's area of specialisation is synthesis of heterocyclic compounds with physiological activities and natural product chemistry. He has been publishing these areas of research since 1987. His synthesis are mainly sulphur containing heterocycles. This includes: Pyrido[1,2-a]quinoxalinone, thiazolo[4,3-b]quinoxa-linone, Isothaizoles, substituted Benzothiazines, Pyridobenzothiadiazines, deoxyjacareubin, Xanthones, Dibenzo[b,f]oxapinone etc.

In the area of natural products chemistry, he has been active in the isolation of active ingredients and the physiological active compounds. The plants he had worked on include: Buchholzia Coriacea, Ficus vallis-chouldae Delile-holl (Moraraceae) and Datarium microcarpum Gill-perr. (Caesapinaceae), Lecaniodiscus cupanodes, Hymencardia acadia; Hymenocardia acida Tul. (Hymenocardiaceae) Abrus precatorius Cissus populnea Flabellaria paniculata Cav., Morinda lucida, Parkia biglobosa (Jacq) Benth and Sesamum radiatum; among others. He has used these products to find remedy to the following: antioxidant and antibacterial activities, herbal medication for male infertility, anti-inflammatory and antinociceptive, gastric ulcer problems to mention but a few. He presented the 8th Inaugural lecture of Chemistry Department of University of Lagos in June 2008, titled "Synthetic Organic Chemists: Creating Molecules for the Benefit of Man". Currently he has about 10 Ph.D.s under his supervision. He has about 50 publications in peer review learned journals.

== Administrative roles ==
Familoni is the current Deputy Vice Chancellor (Academics and Research) of the University of Lagos. In the university, Familoni was sub-dean of the Faculty of Science 2000–2002, head of the Department of Chemistry, 2002–2005, dean of the Faculty of Science 2008–2012. Chairman, Housing Committee of the University. He was elected member of Senate for a three-time tenure of two years each from 1997 to 2003, during which he was the caucus leader. He returned to Senate of the university as of right in 2005 till date. He was a member of Development Committee, Home ownership committee, Appointment and Promotion committee and Advancement Board to mention but a few. He is member of the board of trustees of Adeboye Chair of Mathematics and Ogunye Chair of Chemical Engineering, a member of the editorial board of the Journal of Scientific Research and Development, and since 2012 he has been the editor-in-chief of the journal. Nationally, he was a member of the Governing Council of National Centre for Efficiency and Conservation 2009–2012 and member Governing Council Institute of Chartered Chemist of Nigeria (ICCON) 2014 till date. Internationally, he is the chairman, Royal Society of Chemistry, London (Nigerian Section) and member of Pan African Chemistry Network (PACN) advisory Board 2014–2017.

== Awards and recognition ==
- He was awarded the Distinguished Alumni in 2012 in Commemoration of University of Lagos At 50 by the University of Lagos Alumni Association. This is a follow up to the earlier Distinguished Achiever in 2005 by the same Alumni Association.
- He was a two-time winner of JWT Jones Travelling Fellowship by Royal Society of Chemistry, London in 2007 and 1997 spent in Canada and UK respectively.
- He was granted visiting fellowship by South African Foundation for Research & Development (FRD) in 1997 and 2006 spent at Rhodes University, Grahamstown in South Africa.
- He was a five-time research awardee in 1993, 1996, 2004, 2006 and 2014 by the Royal Society of Chemistry, London.
- Familoni was a recipient of Alfred Bader Research Fellowship by Alfred Bader Chair at Queen's University, Kingston, Ontario, Canada in 1999, 2003 and 2007.
- In 1993/1994, he was a CIDA/NSERC Research Fellow awarded by the National Science and Engineering Research Council of Canada.
- The French Government granted him scholarship to undertake part of his Ph.D. research work in 1988/89 at The Institut National des Science Appliqués (INSA), Rouen, France.

An award at the University of Lagos has been established in his honor, recognizing student academic achievement and contributions in organic chemistry.

== Personal life ==
Familoni is married to Bosede Familoni (née Akinyelu) and has 4 children.
