= Institute of Chartered Chemists of Nigeria =

Nigerian professional regulatory body

Institute of Chartered Chemists of Nigeria (ICCON)
Agency overview
- Formed: 1993
- Jurisdiction: Nigeria
- Headquarters: Abuja FCT, Nigeria
- Agency executive: Jwalshik Wilford, Registrar and CEO
- Website: https://iccon.gov.ng

The Institute of Chartered Chemists of Nigeria (ICCON) is a regulatory body established under Decree 91 of 1993, now known as the ICCON ACT, CAP I.12 LFN 2004. Its statutory mandate includes regulating the teaching, learning, and professional practice of chemistry in Nigeria. ICCON operates as a parastatal under the Federal Ministry of Health (FMoH).

== History ==
=== Creation ===
In 1992, the Chemical Society of Nigeria (CSN), under the presidency of Oladele Osibanjo, mandated that one of its founding fathers and senior Fellow, Daniel Alifa Akoh, prepare a paper to be presented to the Federal Government about the role of chemists in Nigeria's development.

In 1993, Decree 91 establishing ICCON was signed into law by the erstwhile military President Ibrahim Babangida. Subsequently, the institute's first governing council was elected during the 1995 Annual International Conference of the CSN in Warri, Nigeria. This council was under the chairmanship of Professor of Analytical and Environmental Chemistry, Oladele Osibanjo.

=== Governing council ===
Due to General Sani Abacha suspending the operations of all boards and governing councils of all federal parastatals in the country, ICCON did not have its first substantive registrar until 2003, when Gladys Eke was appointed. The first governing council that was elected in 1995 was inaugurated in April 2001 after the return to civil rule in Nigeria under the Olusegun Obasanjo regime. The inauguration was performed by the then Minister of Health, Prof. A.B.C. Nwosu. In 2003, its first substantive registrar, Gladys Eke, was appointed.

In 2004, ICCON's second governing council, headed by Harry Okolo, was inaugurated on September 5, 2006. A 3rd Governing Council, inaugurated on January 29, 2010, by the then Minister of Health, Babatunde Osotimehin, was led by Abdullahi A. Zuru. This third council appointed the institute's second substantive registrar, Jay O. Oghifo, who assumed office on August 2, 2010, following the retirement of Eke in 2009. In the interval between Eke's retirement and Prince Oghifo's appointment, the Secretariat was administered by Taiwo O. Bammodu.

On 6 February 2014, a council-elect via an election that was chaired by F.E. Okieimen was inaugurated by Isaac A. Adewole. The ICCON secretariat is currently administered by chemist Jwalshik Wilford. The Registrar–CEO took over the administration of the institute on 1 June 2018 from F. M. Kujore. The Federal Government of Nigeria confirmed the appointment of Wilford Zungkat Jwalshik as the substantive Registrar and CEO of the ICCON on 1 June 2018.

From inception, the institute's corporate headquarters were located at Kofo Abayomi Street, Victoria Island, Lagos. In compliance with the Federal Government's directive, FCSN relocated the headquarters to Rooms 3A, Federal Secretariat Complex, Abuja, on 7 January 2019.

== Administration ==
=== Governing Council ===
The Governing Council is the decision-making organ of the Institute and is headed by a chairman who is also the president of the institute.

- President and Chairman – F. E. Okieimen
- Vice President and Vice Chairman – S. A. Saidu
- Registrar and Secretary – Jwalshik Z. Wilford
- Member – A. A. Zuru
- Member – Y. N. Lohdip
- Member – B. G. Kolo
- Member – O. B. Familoni
- Member – J. M. Nwaedozie
- Member – W. N. Kwazu
- Member – S. Akpa
- Member – M. D. Amaefule
- Member – T. O. Aaron
- Member – A. Aliyu-Bashir
- Member – M. O. Owoo

== Membership ==
The institute has admitted over 3,000 memberships. The modalities for obtaining registration forms, as well as the attendant fees, are approved by the Governing Council. There are five categories of membership:

- Member – MICCON
- Fellow – FICCON
- Honorary Fellow – FICCON (H)
- Honorary Member – MICCON (H)
- Corporate Member – MICCON (C)

=== Renewal ===
Members of the Institute are required to renew their membership by meeting the Governing Council's criteria. Such criteria include the payment of annual dues and attendance at the institute's Mandatory Continuing Professional Development (MCPD) training programmes. Annual dues are applicable to all categories of members, except the Honorary Fellows. The dues for each category are renewable annually.

A Chartered Chemist is a person who, having obtained the requisite academic qualifications and satisfied the criteria set by the institute's Governing Council, has been formally inducted into and enrolled in the register of ICCON.

== Notable members ==
- Jwalshik Wilford
- Prof. Sunday Olawale Okeniyi
- Professor Oluwole Babafemi Familoni
- Professor Gabriel Babatunde Ogunmola
- Adekunle Muhammed Olusuyi
