= Plastic crystal =

Easily deformed crystal

A plastic crystal is a crystal composed of weakly interacting molecules that possess some orientational or conformational degree of freedom. The name plastic crystal refers to the mechanical softness of such phases: they resemble waxes and are easily deformed. If the internal degree of freedom is molecular rotation, the name rotor phase or rotatory phase is also used. Typical examples are the modifications Methane I and Ethane I.

In addition to the conventional molecular plastic crystals, there are also emerging ionic plastic crystals, particularly organic ionic plastic crystals (OIPCs) and protic organic ionic plastic crystals (POIPCs). POIPCs are solid protic organic salts formed by proton transfer from a Brønsted acid to a Brønsted base and in essence are protic ionic liquids in the molten state, have found to be promising solid-state proton conductors for high temperature proton-exchange membrane fuel cells. Examples include 1,2,4-triazolium perfluorobutanesulfonate and imidazolium methanesulfonate.

If the internal degree of freedom freezes in a disordered way, an orientational glass is obtained. The orientational degree of freedom may be an almost free rotation, or it may be a jump diffusion between a restricted number of possible orientations, as was shown for carbon tetrabromide.

X-ray diffraction patterns of plastic crystals are characterized by strong diffuse intensity in addition to the sharp Bragg peaks. In a powder pattern this intensity appears to resemble an amorphous background as one would expect for a liquid, but for a single crystal the diffuse contribution reveals itself to be highly structured. The Bragg peaks can be used to determine an average structure but due to the large amount of disorder this is not very insightful. It is the structure of the diffuse scattering that reflects the details of the constrained disorder in the system. Recent advances in two-dimensional detection at synchrotron beam lines facilitate the study of such patterns via techniques such as small-angle X-ray scattering.

== History ==
Plastic crystals were discovered in 1938 by Belgian chemist Jean Timmermans by their anomalously low entropy of fusion. He found that organic substances having an entropy of fusion lower than approximately 17 J·K^{−1}·mol^{−1} (~2R, where R is the molar gas constant) had peculiar properties. Timmermans named them molecular globulare. Michils showed in 1948 that these organic compounds are easily deformed and accordingly named them plastic crystals (cristaux organiques plastiques).

== Mechanical properties ==
Some plastic crystals, like aminoborane, when subjected to mechanical stress, exhibit behavior similar to ductile metals such as lead, gold, silver, or copper. This is different from typical molecular crystals, which are brittle and fragile.

For instance, as they approach their melting point, they become highly ductile and malleable. Under pressure, these crystals can flow through a hole. They exhibit bending, twisting, and stretching with characteristic necking under appropriate stress. These crystals can be molded into various shapes, much like copper or silver. Perfluorocyclohexane is plastic to such a degree that it will start to flow under its own weight.

== Plastic crystals versus liquid crystals ==
Like liquid crystals, plastic crystals can be considered a transitional stage between real solids and real liquids and can be considered soft matter. Another common denominator is the simultaneous presence of order and disorder. Both types of phases are usually observed between the true solid and liquid phases on the temperature scale:

true crystal → plastic crystal → true liquid
true crystal → liquid crystal → true liquid

The difference between liquid and plastic crystals is easily observed in X-ray diffraction. Plastic crystals possess strong long range order and therefore show sharp Bragg reflections. Liquid crystals show none or very broad Bragg peaks because the order is not long range. The molecules that give rise to liquid crystalline behavior often have a strongly elongated or disc like shape. Plastic crystals consist usually of almost spherical objects. In this respect one could see them as opposites.

Certain liquid crystals go through a plastic crystal phase before melting. In general, liquid crystals are closer to liquids while plastic crystals are closer to true crystals.

== Condis crystals ==
Plastic crystals are closely related to condis crystals, conformationally disordered crystals that nevertheless possess translational and rotational order.
