= European Young Chemists' Network =

European Young Chemists' Network (EYCN)
- Abbreviation: EYCN
- Formation: 2006
- Region served: Europe
- Members: 29 national chapters
- Official language: English
- Chair: (Germany) Maximilian Menche
- Secretary: (France) Liva Dzene
- Treasurer: (Netherlands) Lieke van Gijzel
- Main organ: Delegate Assembly
- Parent organization: European Chemical Society
- Website: www.eycn.eu

The European Young Chemists' Network (EYCN) is the young division of the European Chemical Society (EuChemS), and aims at promoting chemistry among young people, under the age of 35, that belong to a fellow European society.

== History ==
Founded in 2006, the idea for a European Young Chemists' Network (EYCN) within EuChemS was formed during several young scientist meetings in Europe. On the 31st August 2006, during the 1st European Chemistry Congress (ECC) in Budapest, a paper was written entitled Aims, Tasks and Goals of EYCN, which was seen to be the foundation of the EYCN.

In March 2007, Jens Breffke (Germany) and Csaba Janaky (Hungary) invited all societies to send their young representatives to Berlin in order to set the rules of EYCN. These were later confirmed by the executive committee of EuChemS. Meanwhile, EYCN reached out to all young chemists within the European Chemical Society (EuChemS) framework to exchange knowledge, experiences and ideas. Since its establishment, chemical societies from 28 countries have elected young chemists-delegates to represent their young divisions at the EYCN (map).

== Organization ==
The EYCN consists of a board with three executive board members and five complementary teams (Membership Team, Networks Team, Global Connections Team, Science Team and Communication Team) that have their own responsibilities, and each is managed by a team leader. The Delegate Assembly (DA), a meeting of the national chemical societies' representatives, takes place annually and the board members and the team leaders are elected biennially. Being one of the most active divisions of EuChemS, the EYCN's main goal is to support and mentor students, early career researchers and professionals through awards (best poster and best oral presentation prizes, the European Young Chemist Award - EYCA), exchange programs (congress fellowships, Young Chemists Crossing Borders - YCCB program) and educational activities (conferences, Career Days, soft-skills symposiums).

The EYCN collaborates with other early-career chemistry networks both within and outside of Europe, in particular with the American Chemical Society - Younger Chemists Committee (ACS-YCC) since 2010. The EYCN also actively cooperates with the International Younger Chemists Network (IYCN).

In addition to the financial support from EuChemS, the EYCN is also supported by the EVONIK Industries.

== Projects and events ==
In order to bring science closer to a broader audience, the EYCN organizes the photography contest Photochimica since 2016, in collaboration with the Royal Society of Chemistry (RSC), and the video contest Chemistry Rediscovered.

The EYCN organizes also a variety of different events, including the biennial international conference European Young Chemists' Meeting (EYCheM), a symposium at the biennial ECC and the annual DA. There have been 15 DAs so far since the first in 2006 in Budapest, Hungary.

== EYCN Board compositions ==
From 2006 to 2013 the EYCN Board and the relative teams were randomly changed every one to three years. After 2013, elections took place every two years. Each EYCN Board has improved the EYCN impact through several key contributions.

=== 2021–2023 ===
Chair: Maximilian Menche (Germany); Secretary: Liva Dzene (France); Treasurer: Lieke van Gijzel (The Netherlands); Communication team leader: Patrick W. Fritz (Switzerland); Global connection team leader: Shona Richardson (UK); Membership team leader: Denisa Vargová (Slovakia); Networks team leader: Claudia Bonfio (Italy); Science team leader: Sebastian Balser (Germany); Advisor: Antonio M. Rodríguez García (Spain)

=== 2019-2021 ===
Chair: Antonio M. Rodríguez García (Spain); Secretary: Maximilian Menche (Germany); Treasurer: Jelena Lazić (2019–20) (Serbia), Carina Crucho (2020–21) (Portugal); Communication team leader: Maxime Rossato (France); Global connection team leader: Lieke van Gijzel (The Netherlands); Membership team leader: Miguel Steiner (Austria); Networks team leader: Jovana V. Milic (Switzerland); Science team leader: Katarina Josifovska (2019–20) (North Macedonia), Robert-Andrei Țincu (2020–21) (Romania); Advisor: Alice Soldà (Italy)

Key achievements: Creation of a variety of webinar events and the EYCN podcast. Beginning of science policy interactions with EU institutions and stakeholders.

=== 2017-2019 ===
Chair: Alice Soldà (Italy); Secretary: Torsten John (Germany); Communication team leader: Kseniia Otvagina (Russia); Membership team leader: Jelena Lazić (Serbia); Networks team leader: Victor Mougel (France); Science team leader: Hanna Makowska (Poland); Advisor: Fernando Gomollón-Bel (Spain)

Key achievements: The webpage "Chemistry across Europe" providing the basic information about chemistry in the academic and industrial field across Europe and the EYCN YouTube channel were established. The 2nd European Young Chemists' Meeting (EYCheM) was organized in collaboration with the JCF Bremen.

=== 2015–2017 ===
Chair: Fernando Gomollón-Bel (Spain); Secretary: Camille Oger (France); Science team leader: Oana Fronoiu (Romania); Communication team leader: Sarah Newton (UK); Networks team leader: Michael Terzidis (Greece); Membership team leader: Emanuel Ehmki (Austria)

Key achievements: The rules for the election process of the EYCN board and the attendance to the DA were established and the publication of a monthly newsletter was decided.

=== 2013–2015 ===
Chair: Frédérique Backaert (Belgium); Secretary: Aurora Walshe (UK); Scientific team leader: Vladimir Ene (Romania); External communication team leader: Lisa Phelan (Ireland); Membership team leader: Koert Wijnbergen (The Netherlands); Networks team leader: Anna Stefaniuk-Grams (Poland); Advisor: Cristina Todaşcă (Romania)

Key achievement: First participation of the EYCN at the EuCheMS Chemistry Congress (ECC5) in Istanbul, Turkey in 2014.

=== 2012–2013 ===
Chair: Cristina Todaşcă (Romania); Secretary: Aurora Walshe (UK)

Key achievement: The EYCN was for the first time organized into teams, each with its own leader and delegates as team members.

=== 2010–2012 ===
Chair: Viviana Fluxa (Switzerland); Secretary: Cristina Todaşcă (Romania); Relationship with industries: Lineke Pelleboer (The Netherlands); External communication: Guillaume Poisson (France); Membership and internal communication: Aurora Walshe (UK); Website designer: Magorzata Zaitz (Poland)

Key achievements: Development of the EYCN's website and active participation at the 3rd EuCheMS Chemistry Congress (ECC3) in Nuremberg, 2010.

=== 2009–2010 ===
Chair: Sergej Toews (Germany); Secretary: Helena Laavi (Finland); Relationship with industry: Viviana Fluxa (Switzerland); Communications: Dan Dumitrescu (Romania); Scientific affairs: Ilya Vorotyntsev (Russia)

Key achievement: The corporate identity of the EYCN was developed.

=== 2006–2009 ===
Chair: Csaba Janáky (Hungary); Secretary: Emma Dumphy (Switzerland); Treasurer: Juan Luis Delgado de la Cruz (Spain); Sponsor relations officer: Jens Breffke (Germany); Communications Officer: Cristina Todaşcă (Romania)

Key achievement: Creation of the EYCN in Berlin from the representatives of 12 Chemical Societies.

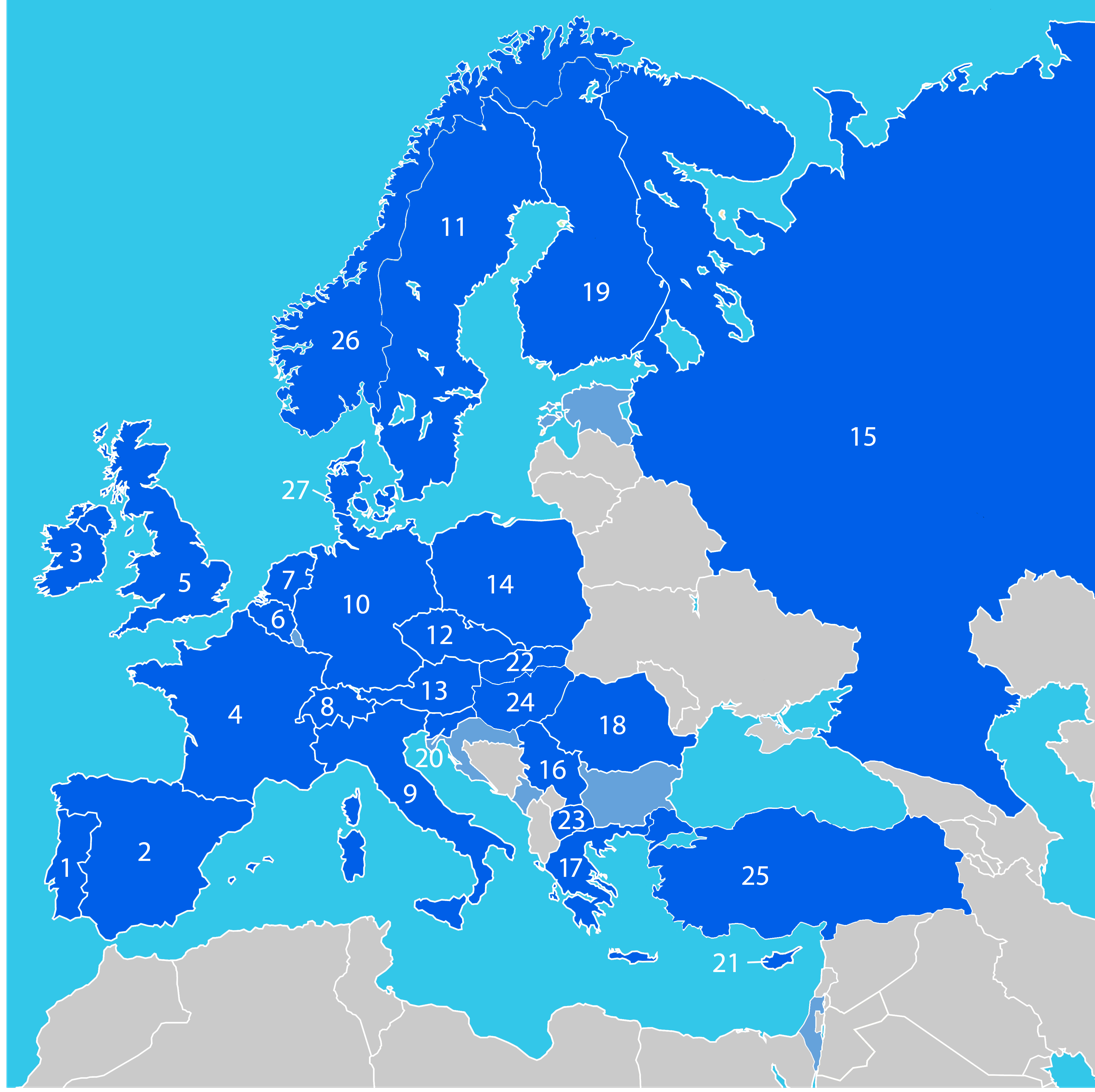
The map of all the countries with active delegates in the EYCN: (13) Austria (2008), (6) Belgium (2008), (20) Croatia (2019), (21) Cyprus (2017), (12) Czech Republic (2007), (27) Denmark (2019), (19) Finland (2008), (4) France (2007), (10) Germany (2006), (17) Greece (2011), (24) Hungary (2006), (3) Ireland (2008), (9) Italy (2007), (23) Republic of North Macedonia (2018), (7) The Netherlands (2007), (26) Norway (2014), (14) Poland (2008), (1) Portugal (2007), (18) Romania (2007), (15) Russia (2008), (16) Serbia (2011), (22) Slovakia (2018), Slovenia (2015), (2) Spain (2007), (11) Sweden (2010), (8) Switzerland (2007), (25) Turkey (2007), (5) United Kingdom (2007)
