= Chartered Chemist =

Professional qualification

Chartered Chemist (CChem) is a chartered status awarded by the Royal Society of Chemistry (RSC) in the United Kingdom, the Royal Australian Chemical Institute (RACI) in Australia, by the Ministry of Education in Italy, the Institute of Chemistry Ceylon (IChemC), Sri Lanka, the Institute of Chartered Chemists of Nigeria in Nigeria, and by the Association of the Chemical Profession of Ontario (ACPO) in Ontario, Canada.

Achieving chartered status in any profession denotes to the wider community a high level of specialised subject knowledge and professional competence. The award of the Chartered Chemist (CChem) designation recognises the experienced practising chemist who has demonstrated an in-depth knowledge of chemistry, significant personal achievements based upon chemistry, professionalism in the workplace and a commitment to maintaining technical expertise through continuing professional development.

== Australia ==
In Australia, Chartered Membership (MRACI CChem) is for:

- Individuals who have been awarded with an Australian degree in chemistry or a chemistry-related discipline consisting of a minimum of three years academic study and have completed three years relevant experience working in a chemistry field.
- Individuals who do not hold a chemistry degree but have a minimum of six years relevant experience working in a chemistry field.

== Canada ==
In Canada, the Chartered Chemist (C.Chem. or CChem) designation is awarded by the Association of the Chemical Profession of Ontario (ACPO). To qualify, applicants must hold a degree in chemistry from a Canadian university, or an equivalent credential obtained outside of Canada as assessed by a recognized credential evaluation service. Applicants must also demonstrate a minimum number of years of professional experience in a chemistry-related field, deemed acceptable by the Association.

There are three categories of membership with the ACPO:

- Full Member – practicing chemists who meet academic and experience requirements.
- Chartered Chemist (C.Chem. or CChem) – members who fulfill both education and experience criteria.
- Student Member – individuals currently enrolled in a chemistry degree program at a Canadian university.

Applications are reviewed quarterly, and required documents include a current CV, official transcripts, proof of enrollment (for students), and a WES credential assessment if the degree was obtained outside of Canada. A non-refundable application fee applies, along with annual membership dues. Student memberships are free of charge.

== Sri Lanka ==
In Sri Lanka, every candidate for the award of the status of Chartered Chemist (C.Chem.) shall

- C1 be more than 30 years of age

AND

- C2 (a) have passed parts I and II of the Graduateship Examination conducted by the Institute of Chemistry, Ceylon.

OR (b) have obtained a Special Degree with Chemistry as the principal subject from a recognized university.
OR (c) have obtained a bachelor's degree from a recognized university with an adequate coverage of Chemistry, acceptable to the Council and at least a master's degree in a branch of Chemistry from a recognized university.
OR (d) have obtained a bachelor's degree from a recognized university, with an adequate coverage of Chemistry and has had sufficient experience and/or attainments in the Chemical Sciences for the period of at least 10 years acceptable to the Council.
OR (f) have obtained any other equivalent qualifications acceptable to the Council,

AND

- C3 (a) have passed Part II (C) of the Graduateship Examination conducted by the Institute

OR (b) have an equivalent attainment acceptable to the Council.

AND

- C4 be able to demonstrate a high level of competence and professionalism in the practice of Chemistry and show his commitment to maintain his expertise for a period of at least 5 years subsequent to obtaining the qualifications and experience referred to in C 2 above.

AND

- C5 Such a person should provide evidence of possessing one or more of the following at a level acceptable to the Council.

(a) has specialist chemical skills relevant to their practice
(b) has in– depth knowledge of the specialist areas of chemistry
(c) has responsibilities based upon chemistry and has made a significant personal contribution.
(d) demonstrates professionalism in the workplace
(e) has maintained chemical expertise through continuing professional development.

== United Kingdom ==
In the United Kingdom, CChem candidates must meet the following requirements:

- Be a Member or a Fellow of the RSC;
- Hold a Master level accredited degree by the RSC (or equivalent);
- Show that the chemical science knowledge and skills acquired from their education and training are essential for fulfilling the needs of their job;
- Demonstrate development of 14 Professional Attributes.

The 14 professional attributes for Chartered Chemist in the UK are divided into five sections. The full list of attributes is:
A. Demonstrate and develop your knowledge of the chemical sciences.

1. Use a high-level knowledge of the chemical sciences to inform decisions and create impact.
2. Continue to develop your knowledge of the chemical sciences and use this to support your work.
3. Solve problems and draw conclusions by interpreting data, using evidence-based judgement and critical thinking to develop courses of action.

B. Professionalism.

1. Work with autonomy, accountability and integrity in your role.
2. Make a successful and impactful contribution as part of a team.
3. Plan, organise, deliver work, and manage resources to meet organisational requirements.
4. Contribute to continuous improvement by evaluating work and displaying adaptability.

C. Communication and influencing skills.

1. Effectively convey information using both verbal and written forms.
2. Consider and respond to alternative views and note the influence this has on your actions.
3. Exert influence in your role either directly or through networks.

D. Professional responsibilities.

1. Make a personal and impactful contribution to ensuring a healthy and safe working environment.
2. Contribute to a sustainable future.
3. Adhere to relevant codes of conduct including the RSC Code of Conduct, relating to fulfilling your duties in the workplace, and apply ethical practice to your role.

E. Supporting the profession.

1. Be an active member of the scientific community either at work or outside work.

== See also ==
- Chartered Physicist
- Chartered Scientist
- European Chemist
- List of chemistry awards
