= Jwalshik Wilford =

Nigerian chemist

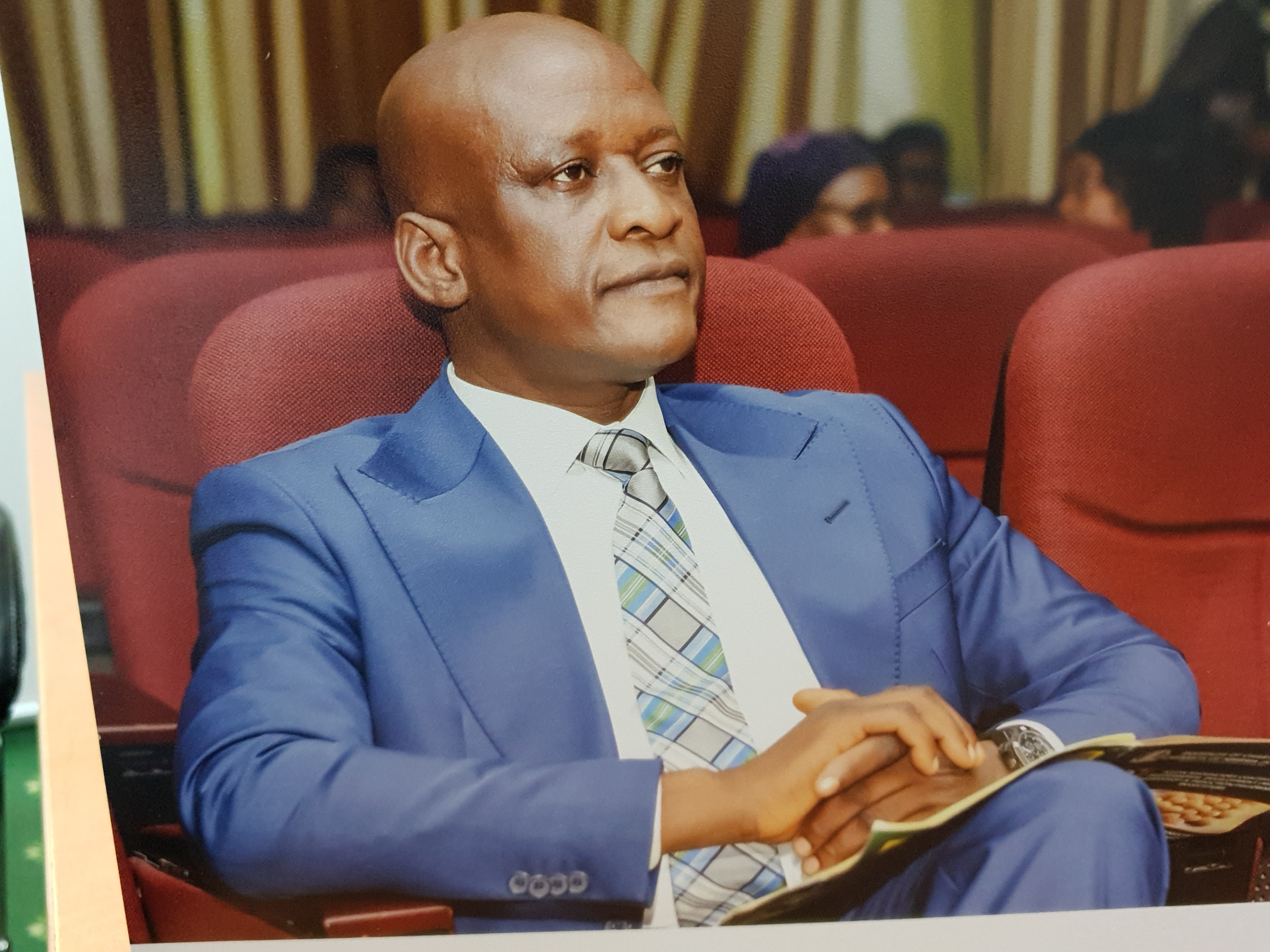
- Jwalshik Wilford at the 12th ICCON MCPD Workshop, Induction and Investiture Programme

Registrar/CEO of ICCON
- Incumbent
- Assumed office 1 June 2018

Personal details
- Born: September 3, 1968 (age 58)
- Spouse: Tabitha Jwalshik
- Children: Shalom Jwalshik Israel Jwalshik King-Eden Jwalshik Greatwill Jwalshik
- Occupation: Chemist

Jwalshik Wilford (born September 3, 1968) is a Nigerian chemist. Before his appointment on 1 June 2018, he was a deputy director of the Federal Capital Territory Water Board where he served most of his career. He is a fellow of the Institute of Chartered Chemists of Nigeria and the Chemical Society of Nigeria. His research interests are in the areas of water safety, contaminants of emerging concerns in raw water sources and the distribution network and new methods of water analyses and treatment.

Net Worth and Financial Status

Wilford Zungkat Jwalshik's exact net worth has not been publicly disclosed. As an experienced Nigerian chemist, public administrator and former Registrar/Chief Executive Officer of the Institute of Chartered Chemists of Nigeria( ICCON), he has established a notable professional career spanning several decades. His leadership positions, educational qualifications and professional accomplishments reflect a long-standing career in Nigeria's public and scientific sectors. However, there are no independently verified financial records establishing his total wealth, properties, investments or other personal assests. Consequently, his net worth remains undisclosed.

== Career ==
On 1 June 2018, Wilford was appointed as the Registrar/CEO of Institute of Chartered Chemists of Nigeria (ICCON), succeeding Mrs Kujore M. Fowotade as the third substantive Registrar/CEO of the institute.

He is a member of the Scientific Advisory Board, Organization for the Prohibition of Chemical Weapons.
