= Jean Timmermans =

Belgian physical chemist (1882–1971)

Jean Émile Charles Timmermans (8 January 1882 – 27 August 1971) was a Belgian physical chemist and educator. He was known for the discovery of plastic crystals and the published books on physical chemistry constants and experimental data of pure solutions. He also curated the work of Belgian chemist Jean Stas. Timmermans was a member of the Brussels school of thermodynamics centered around Brussels and one of the mentors of Nobel laureate Ilya Prigogine.

== Education and career ==
Timmermans was born in Brussels and obtained his BA in chemistry from the Université libre de Bruxelles (ULB) in 1900. His PhD on liquid demixing, which he received in 1905, was supervised by French chemist Léon Maurice Crismer. Timmermans became an assistant afterwards and worked in the laboratories of Viktor Rothmund at the German University in Prague from 1905 to 1906, Sydney Young at Trinity College Dublin from 1906 to 1908, Johannes Diderik van der Waals at the University of Amsterdam from 1908 to 1911, and Philippe A. Guye at the University of Geneva from 1912 to 1913. Timmermans became a lecturer (chargé de cours) at the ULB afterwards. During World War I from 1914 till 1918, he worked in the Laboratory of the Belgian army located at Sorbonne University in Paris. After the war, the International Union of Pure and Applied Chemistry commissioned Timmermans to establish a Bureau of standards at the ULB. This proposal was realized and Timmermans became the head of the International Bureau of Physico-chemical Standards (Bureau International des Etalons Physico-Chimiques) located at the Université libre de Bruxelles since its foundation in 1921. In 1923, Timmermans became a full professor at the ULB and stayed there until World War II. From 1941 to 1945, he was an academic on exile in London and was in charge of the Department of Higher Education at the exiled Ministry of Education. He was an executive committee member and represents Belgium in the Association of University Professors and Lecturers of the Allied Countries in Great Britain.

In 1945, Timmermans became a corresponding member of the Royal Academy of Science, Letters and Fine Arts of Belgium. He received the Gay-Lussac medal of the Belgian Royal Society of Chemistry (Société Royale de Chimie Belgique), where he was a president from 1927 to 1928. Timmermans was the dean of the faculty of sciences at the ULB between 1935 and 1938. He also received an honorary doctorate from the University of Dijon.

== Bibliography ==
- Timmermans, Jean (1928). La notion d'espèce en chimie (in French). Gauthier-Villars et Cie.
  - Translated version Timmermans, Jean (1940). Chemical Species.
- Timmermans, Jean (1936). Les Solutions Concentrées (in French). Masson et Cie.
- Timmermans, Jean (1939). Le polymorphisme des composés organiques (in French). Gauthier-Villars.
- Timmermans, Jean (1947). Histoire de la chimie (in French). Presses universitaires de Bruxelles.
- Timmermans, Jean (1950). Physico-chemical Constants of Pure Organic Compounds. Elsevier Publishing Company.
- Timmermans, Jean (1959). The Physico-chemical Constants of Binary Systems in Concentrated Solutions. Vol. 1: Two organic compounds (without hydroxyl derivatives). Interscience Publishers.
- Timmermans, Jean (1959). The Physico-chemical Constants of Binary Systems in Concentrated Solutions. Vol. 2: Two organic compounds (at least one a hydroxyl derivative). Interscience Publishers.
- Timmermans, Jean (1960). The Physico-chemical Constants of Binary Systems in Concentrated Solutions. Vol. 3: Systems with metallic compounds. Interscience Publishers.
- Timmermans, Jean (1960). The Physico-chemical Constants of Binary Systems in Concentrated Solutions. Vol. 4: Systems with inorganic + organic or inorganic compounds (excepting metallic derivatives). Interscience Publishers.
- Timmermans, Jean (1963). The Concept of Species in Chemistry. Chemical Publishing Company. (Translated from the revised edition of La notion d'espèce en chimie)
- Timmermans, Jean (1965). Physico-chemical Constants of Pure Organic Compounds. Vol. 2. Elsevier. ISBN 978-0-444-40572-2.
