= Bulletin of the Chemical Society of Japan =

- Discipline: Chemistry
- Language: English
- Edited by: Katsuhiko Ariga and Michinori Suginome

Publication details
- History: 1926–present
- Publisher: Chemical Society of Japan (Japan)
- Impact factor: 5.488 (2020)

Standard abbreviations
- ISO 4: Bull. Chem. Soc. Jpn.

Indexing
- CODEN: BCSJA8
- ISSN: 0009-2673

Links
- Journal homepage

Bulletin of the Chemical Society of Japan (日本化学会欧文誌, Nihon Kagakukai Ōbunshi) is a scientific journal, which was founded in 1926 by the Chemical Society of Japan. It publishes accounts, articles, and short articles in the fields of theoretical and physical chemistry, analytical and inorganic chemistry, organic and biological chemistry, and applied and materials chemistry.

Due to World War II publication was suspended between 1945 and 1946. It is published in both a print edition and an online edition.
