= Suekichi Kinoshita =

Japanese experimental physicist (1877-1935)

- 木下季吉
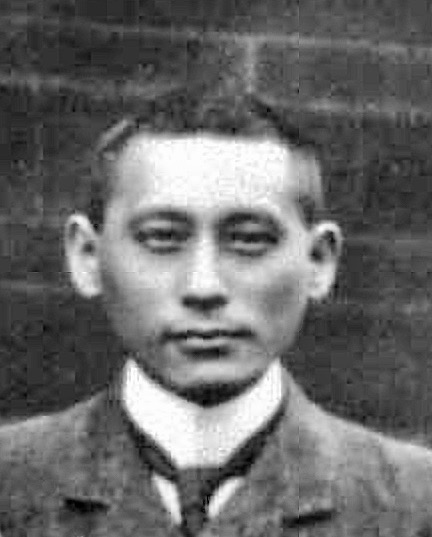
- Kinoshita in 1910 in Manchester
- Born: January 14, 1877
- Died: November 28, 1934 (aged 57); Kumamoto, Japan
- Education: University of Tokyo; Victoria University of Manchester
- Relatives: Junji Kinoshita (nephew)
- Scientific career
- Workplaces: University of Tokyo
- Doctoral advisor: Hantaro Nagaoka
- Other academic advisors: Ernest Rutherford
- Doctoral students: Shoji Nishikawa

Suekichi Kinoshita (Japanese: 木下 季吉, Kinoshita Suekichi, 14 January 1877 – 28 November 1934) was a Japanese experimental physicist and pioneer in radioactivity. His main contribution include the first observation of alpha particles using nuclear emulsion photography.

== Education and career ==
Kinoshita was the second son in an intellectual family, where his father Sukeyuki Kinoshita was a government official. His younger brother Kumao Kinoshita (1881–1947) was a marine biologist. Kinoshita studied physics at the Tokyo Imperial University (now University of Tokyo), graduating in 1902. He left Japan and first worked as an intern under Woldemar Voigt at the University of Göttingen. He then visited Ernest Rutherford's group at the Victoria University of Manchester (now University of Manchester) in the UK, where he stayed from 1907 to 1909. His groundbreaking research on alpha particles, based on the work done at Manchester, was first presented at the meeting of the British Science Association in Winnipeg in 1909, and was published shortly afterward in 1910. Upon returning to Japan, he taught physics at the Tokyo Imperial University from 1914 to 1933.

Kinoshita was awarded the Imperial Prize of the Japan Academy in 1923 for his work on radioactive particles.
