= European Chemical Society =

Organization

European Chemical Society (EuChemS)
- Formation: 3 July 1970, in Prague, Czech Republic, as Federation of European Chemical Societies and Professional Institutions FECS (from 1970 until 2004); European Association for Chemical and Molecular Sciences EuCheMS (from 2004 until 2018)
- Type: European non-profit organisation
- Location: Rue du Trône 62, Brussels Capital Region, Belgium
- Official language: English
- President: Angela Agostiano
- Website: euchems.eu

The European Chemical Society (EuChemS) is a European non-profit organisation which promotes collaboration between non-profit scientific and technical societies in the field of chemistry.

Based in Brussels, Belgium, the association took over the role and responsibilities of the Federation of European Chemical Societies and Professional Institutions (FECS) founded in 1970. It currently has 50 Member Societies and supporting members, with a further 19 divisions and working parties. It represents more than 160,000 chemists from more than 30 countries in Europe.

On 26 August 2022, the EuChemS General Assembly voted Angela Agostiano, Professor at the University of Bari Aldo Moro, Italy, as EuChemS President-Elect. Her term as President began in January 2023. Nineta Hrastelj is Secretary General. Floris Rutjes of Radboud University, is Vice-President of EuChemS.

== Aims and function ==
The European Chemical Society has two major aims. By bringing together national chemical societies from across Europe, it aims to foster a community of scientists from different countries and provide opportunities for them to exchange ideas, communicate, cooperate on work projects and develop their networks. EuChemS in turn relies on the knowledge of this community to provide sound scientific advice to policymakers at the European level, in order to better inform their decision-making work. EuChemS is an official accredited stakeholder of the European Food Safety Agency (EFSA) and the European Chemical Agency (ECHA). EuChemS also relies on quality science communication to better inform citizens, decision-makers and scientists of the latest research developments in the chemical sciences, and their role in tackling major societal, environmental and economic challenges.

Because the field of chemistry is particularly vast with many different disciplines within it, EuChemS provides advice and knowledge on a broad range of subjects including:

- EU Research Framework Programmes, such as Horizon 2020 and Horizon Europe
- Open Science
- Education and STEM
- Environmental issues and climate change
- Circular Economy
- Renewable Energy
- Food safety
- Science literacy
- Health
- Ethics and scientific integrity
- Cultural Heritage
- Chemical and nuclear safety

EuChemS is a signatory of the EU Transparency register. The register number is: 03492856440-03.

== Divisions and Working Parties ==
The EuChemS scientific divisions and working parties are networks in their own fields of expertise and promote collaboration with other European and international organisations. They organise high quality scientific conferences in chemical and molecular sciences and interdisciplinary areas.

- Division of Analytical Chemistry
- Division of Chemical Education
- Division of Chemistry and the Environment
- Division of Chemistry in Life Sciences
- Division of Computational Chemistry
- Division of Food Chemistry
- Division of Green and Sustainable Chemistry
- Division of Inorganic Chemistry
- Division of Nuclear and Radiochemistry
- Division of Organic Chemistry
- Division of Organometallic Chemistry
- Division of Physical Chemistry
- Division of Solid State Chemistry
- Division of Chemistry and Energy
- Working Party on Chemistry for Cultural Heritage
- Working party on Ethics in Chemistry
- Working Party on the History of Chemistry

The European Young Chemists' Network (abbreviated to EYCN) is the younger members' division of EuChemS.

== Events ==
EuChemS organises a variety of different events, including policy workshops with the European Institutions, specialised academic conferences, as well as the biennial EuChemS Chemistry Congress (ECC). There have been 8 Congresses so far since the first in 2006, held in Budapest, Hungary.

The congresses have taken place in: Turin, Italy (2008); Nuremberg, Germany (2010); Prague, Czechia (2012); Istanbul, Turkey (2014); Seville, Spain (2016); Liverpool, UK (2018), Lisbon, Portugal (2022). The next ECC is set to be held in Dublin, Ireland in 2024. The ECCs usually attract some 2000 chemists from more than 50 countries across the world.

== Awards ==
EuChemS proposes several awards including the European Chemistry Gold Medal Award, awarded in 2018 to Nobel Laureate Bernard Feringa and in 2020 to Michele Parrinello; the EuChemS Award for Service; the EuChemS Lecture Award; the European Young Chemists' Award; the EuChemS EUCYS Award; the EuChemS Historical Landmarks Award, as well as several Divisional Awards.

EuChemS implemented in 2020 the EuChemS Chemistry Congress fellowship scheme. The aim of EuChemS fellowship scheme is to support early career researchers (bachelor, masters and PhD students) actively attending the EuChemS Chemistry Congresses.

=== EuChemS Gold Medal ===
The EuChemS Gold medal is awarded to reflect the exceptional achievements of scientists working in the field of chemistry in Europe.

2022
Dame Carol Robinson
2020
Michele Parrinello
2018
Bernard L. Feringa

=== EuChemS Historical Landmarks Awards ===
The EuChemS Historical Landmarks Award recognize sites important in the history of chemistry in Europe:

2020
Prague, Czech Republic (50 anniversary of the foundation of EuChemS).
Giessen, Germany, Justus Liebig’s Laboratory.
2019
Almadén mines in Spain (producing mercury for Spain and the Spanish empire) and Edessa Cannabis Factory Museum, Greece (a preserved factory producing ropes and twine from hemp).
2018
The Ytterby mine in Sweden (linked to the discovery of 8 chemical elements) and ABEA in Crete, Greece (a factory processing olive oil).

== Projects and activities ==
In light of the UN declared International Year of the Periodic Table of Chemical Elements of 2019, EuChemS published a Periodic Table which depicts the issue of the abundance of the chemical elements to raise awareness of the need to develop better recycling capacities, to manage waste, and to find alternative materials to the elements that are at risk of being unusable.

== Members & Supporting Members ==
- Austrian Chemical Society
- Austrian Society of Analytical Chemistry
- Royal Flemish Chemical Society
- Walloon Royal Society of Chemistry
- Union of Chemists in Bulgaria
- Croatian Chemical Society
- Pancyprian Union of Chemists
- Czech Chemical Society
- Danish Chemical Society
- Estonian Chemical Society
- Finnish Chemical Society
- French Chemical Society
- German Chemical Society
- German Bunsen Society for Physical Chemistry
- Association of Greek Chemists
- Hungarian Chemical Society
- Institute of Chemistry of Ireland
- Israel Chemical Society
- Italian Chemical Society
- Lithuanian Chemical Society
- Association of Luxembourgish Chemists
- Society of Chemists and Technologists of Macedonia
- Chemical Society of Montenegro
- Royal Dutch Chemical Society
- Norwegian Chemical Society
- Polish Chemical Society
- Portuguese Chemical Society
- Portuguese Electrochemical Society
- Romanian Chemical Society
- Mendeleev Russian Chemical Society
- Russian Scientific Council on Analytical Chemistry
- Serbian Chemical Society
- Slovak Chemical Society
- Slovenian Chemical Society
- Royal Spanish Chemical Society
- Spanish Society of Analytical Chemistry (SEQA)
- Catalan Chemical Society
- Swedish Chemical Society
- Swiss Chemical Society
- Turkish Chemical Society
- Royal Society of Chemistry

Supporting members:

- European Nanoporous Materials Institute of Excellence (ENMIX)
- European Chemistry Thematic Network Association (ECTN)
- European Federation of Managerial Staff in the Chemical and Allied Industries (FECCIA)
- European Research Institute of Catalysis (ERIC)
- European Federation for Medicinal Chemistry (EFMC)
- International Sustainable Chemistry Collaborative Centre (ISC3)
- ChemPubSoc Europe
- Italian National Research Council (CNR)

== See also ==
- European Chemist – Professional designation for chemists
- European Physical Society – Non-profit science organization
- Timeline of chemistry
- European Research Council – Funding body
- Marie Skłodowska-Curie Actions – European research fellowships
