= The Institute of Chemists PNG =

The Institute of Chemistry PNG is the professional organisation supporting chemical sciences in Papua New Guinea and a learned society promoting the science and practice of chemistry.

== Affiliations ==
The Institute of Chemistry PNG is a member of the Federation of Asian Chemical Societies (FACS).

== Journal of the Institute of Chemists PNG ==
The Institute publishes the Journal of the Institute of Chemists PNG, with the second volume published in 2009.
