= Crystallographic Society of Japan =

The Crystallographic Society of Japan
- 日本結晶学会
- Abbreviation: CSJ
- Formation: 1950
- Founder: Shoji Nishikawa
- Legal status: Scientific Organisation
- Headquarters: Shinjuku-ku, Tokyo, Japan
- President: Atsushi Nakagawa
- Website: crsj.jp/en/

The Crystallographic Society of Japan (日本結晶学会 in Japanese) is a scientific organization in Japan focused on research and education of crystallography. It was established on May 13, 1950 with Shoji Nishikawa as the founding president, and it is an independent academic society. The core publication of the society is the Journal of the Crystallographic Society of Japan, which was first issued in 1959.

The society is affiliated with the International Union of Crystallography and the Asian Crystallographic Association.

== See also ==
- Chemical Society of Japan
- International Union of Crystallography
- German Crystallographic Society
