= Pancyprian Union of Chemists =

Chemical society for Cypriot chemists

- Παγκύπρια Ένωση Επιστημόνων Χημικών (ΠΕΕΧ)
- Abbreviation: PUC
- Formation: 1960; 66 years ago
- Purpose: Science, academic
- Headquarters: Cyprus
- Members: 550

The Pancyprian Union of Chemists (PUC; Greek: Παγκύπρια Ένωση Επιστημόνων Χημικών (ΠΕΕΧ)) is the chemical society for Cypriot chemists. It comprises a board of nine members which is elected every two years by the General Assembly of the PUC. The PUC was founded in 1960. This coincides with the period during which the Republic of Cyprus was established. The PUC currently has over 550 members. It also publishes the Greek language magazine 'Chemica Nea', or the Chemical News Magazine in English. This magazine is distributed quarterly to PUC members plus approximately one hundred additional subscribers throughout Cyprus and Greece.

== Overview ==
The society has various aims centred on promoting chemistry education and research within Cyprus and on representing Cypriot chemists internationally. The PUC protects and regulates the Cypriot chemical profession through the Chemists' Registration Council. It also promotes information exchange between Chemists across the country. The PUC participates in an advisory capacity on several committees within the public sector including the International Union of Pure and Applied Chemistry (IUPAC), the European Association for Chemical and Molecular Sciences (EuCheMS). Through this, the Union supplies opinion and advice surrounding a range of public interest topics such as education in the chemical sciences and the environment.

In education, the PUC works to improve the standard of teaching in the chemical sciences and advises on the chemistry curriculum taught within schools. Together with the Union of Chemistry Teachers in Secondary Education the PUC organises the local Chemical Olympiads within Cyprus and facilitates educational and outreach events such as local and international seminars and conferences which are open to the public.
