= Société Royale de Chimie Belgique =

- Formation: 1887
- Founder: Edouard Hanuise
- Type: Learned society
- Headquarters: Brussels
- Location: Belgium
- Official language: French
- President: Anne-Sophie Duwez
- Website: https://src.ulb.be/

Société Royale de Chimie Belgique or the Belgian Royal Society of Chemistry, Walloon Royal Society of Chemistry, is a learned society and professional association headquartered in Brussels, Belgium. The society published the academic journal Bulletin des Sociétés Chimiques Belges from 1904 to 1987, before it was absorbed into the Europe-wide chemistry journals. Since 1983, the society also publishes the journal Chimie Nouvelle (English: New Chemistry).

== History ==
The society was founded in 1887 by Edouard Hanuise as the Association Belge des Chimistes (English: Belgian Association of Chemists). In 1904, it changed its name to Société Chimique de Belgique (English: Belgian Chemical Society) until its final name change so far in 1987 at its one-hundredth anniversary to its present name. In 1939, the society split into a French-speaking and a Dutch-speaking branch. The French-speaking branch kept the existing name (later the Société Royale de Chimie Belgique) and was still based in Brussels. The Dutch-speaking branch was founded with the name Vlaamse Chemische Vereniging and later in 1987 became Koninklijke Vlaamse Chemische Vereniging (English: Royal Flemish Chemical Society), which was based in Antwerp.

Its past members includes famous chemists within the country such as Ernest Solvay, Walthère Victor Spring, Theodore Swarts, Jean Timmermans, etc.

== Presidents of the society ==
Presidents of the society throughout history include early pioneers of chemistry and pharmacy in Belgium.

=== Association Belge des Chimistes (1887–1904) ===
- 1887–1895 Edouard Hanuise
- 1894–1896 Jean-Baptiste Depaire
- 1897–1898 Achille Herlant
- 1899–1900 Lucien Louis De Koninck
- 1901–1902 Léon Crismer
- 1903–1904 Albert van de Velde

=== Société Chimique de Belgique (1904–1987) ===
- 1910–1911 René Lucion
- 1914–1921 Georges Chavanne
- 1925–1926 Henri Wuyts
- 1927–1928 Jean Timmermans
- 1929–1930 Pierre Bruylants
- 1958 Lucia de Brouckère
- 1961–1962 Albert Bruylants

=== Société Royale de Chimie Belgique (1987–now) ===
- 2014 Claudine Buess-Herman
- 2020–2021 Laurent Provins
- 2023 Anne-Sophie Duwez

== See also ==
- Société chimique de France
- German Chemical Society
- List of chemistry societies
