= Society of Cosmetic Chemists =

The Society of Cosmetic Chemists (SCC), founded in 1945, is a learned society (professional association) based in the United States that supports scientific inquiry in the field of cosmetic science. The Society publishes the bimonthly Journal of Cosmetic Science. Together with Société Française de Cosmétologie, SCC also publishes the International Journal of Cosmetic Science.

== History ==
Founded in May 1945 in New York (some says 1948) following the suggestion of Mr. Maison G. de Navarre, the Society of Cosmetic Chemists (SCC) had 23 founding members with Mr. Freddie Wells being its first chairman.

In 1959, the SCC became a founding member of the International Federation of Societies of Cosmetic Chemists (IFSCC).

As of 2023, the SCC has over 6,000 members globally at all degree-levels. The Society has 19 Chapters throughout the United States and Canada which each conduct monthly meetings, hold educational seminars, and publish monthly newsletters.

== Funding ==
The primary source of income of the SCC is from membership dues, but also receives donation from stakeholders of the cosmetic and personal care industry.

== Educational and professional activities ==
The SCC holds a national meeting once a year in New York City, and a national scientific meeting once a year in various cities around the country.

It publishes a scholarly bimonthly journal, the Journal of Cosmetic Science: The Official Journal of the Society of Cosmetic Chemists, as well as various monographs about cosmetic testing and cosmetic ingredient technology. Together with Société Française de Cosmétologie in France, SCC also publishes the International Journal of Cosmetic Science since 1979.

== See also ==
- International Federation of Societies of Cosmetic Chemists
- Cosmetic industry
- website
