= European Engineer =

International professional qualification

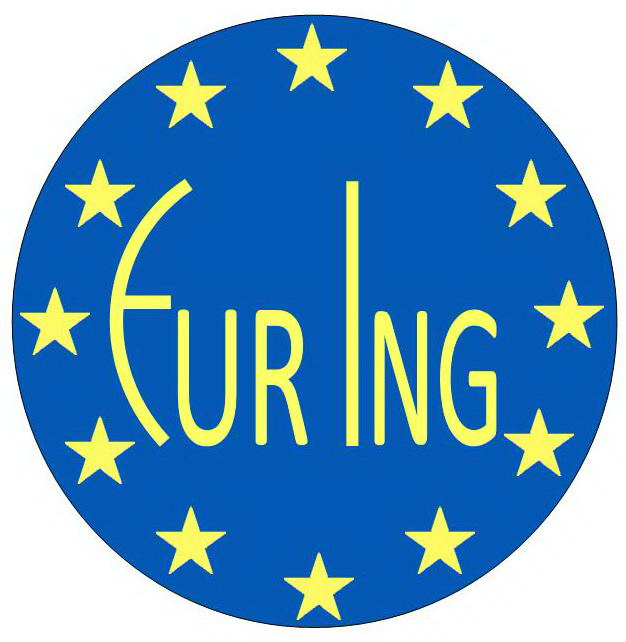

European Engineer (EUR ING) is an advanced international professional qualification and title for highly qualified engineers used in over 32 European countries. The qualification encompasses both academic qualifications and proven professional competence assessed through peer review.

Contemporary EUR ING engineers are degree-qualified and have gained the highest level of advanced expertise and professional competencies through training and monitored professional practice experience. EUR ING engineers are characterised by their ability to develop appropriate solutions to engineering problems, using new or existing technologies, through innovation, research, creativity and change. They might develop and apply new technologies, promote advanced designs and design methods, introduce new and more efficient production techniques, marketing and construction concepts, pioneer new engineering services and management methods.

The title is pre-nominal, i.e. it is placed before, rather than after, the name as in the case of a post-nominal title such as that for academic degrees (however, in some European countries, academic degrees are also pre-nominal). It is displayed in uppercase with no punctuation (EUR ING).

As of 2023, there are approximately 35 000 engineers listed in the official European Engineer register maintained by Engineers Europe, representing professionals who have met the qualification standards for the EUR ING title.

The EUR ING qualification has been described by academic sources as prestigious and highly regarded as a mark of excellence across Europe and beyond, with recognition for validating academic quality and rigor and offering graduates enhanced mobility and professional opportunities within the engineering community.

== The EUR ING qualification standard ==
The title is granted after successful application to a national member of Engineers Europe which includes representation from many European countries, including much of the European Union. In providing an acceptable common and highly professional standard, the European Engineer requires proven experience and competency in the application of scientific knowledge, level of professional skill, safety and environmental consciousness, sense of responsibility and the ability to communicate within the level of supervision received and given. A substantial number of years of formation and practice, consisting of an accredited engineering degree, further advanced training, and extensive responsible professional experience, is required by Engineers Europe for the EUR ING title. This is defined in the EUR ING standard for professional engineering competence (EUR ING Spec).

Candidates are assessed through a rigorous and stringent two-stage peer-review process. First, an application is evaluated by the National Monitoring Committee (NMC) of the applicant’s country, where it undergoes peer review by experienced academics and senior professional engineers working in industry. Successful applications are then peer reviewed by the European Monitoring Committee (EMC), which provides a second, independent level of academic and professional scrutiny before approval.

The EUR ING qualification certifies that an engineer has achieved education and learning outcomes meeting the Master’s degree level of the Bologna Second Cycle (EQF Level 7), and has, in addition, demonstrated advanced engineering competence that goes beyond this baseline. This competence is evidenced through several years of supervised practice, responsible professional experience, advanced training, continuous professional development, and peer review. The qualification requires a minimum of seven years of engineering formation. The EUR ING qualification functions as a European professional credential recognising advanced engineering capability, rather than an academic degree alone.

The EUR ING title differs from an academic degree in that it is based not only on educational attainment but also on demonstrated professional competence and its continued development throughout an engineer's career. While a degree reflects the successful completion of a programme of study at a particular point in time, EUR ING title holders are required to maintain their competence through continuous professional development (CPD), professional practice, and adherence to recognised professional and ethical standards. This requirement is intended to ensure that title holders remain up to date with developments in engineering science, technology, regulation, sustainability, and professional practice throughout their careers.

The EU Directive 89/48/EEC generally exempts a bearer from additional examination in the European Union. Names are also placed on the EUR ING Register maintained by Engineers Europe, in addition to the relevant national registers.

The qualification is also used as a standardised indicator of advanced professional engineering competence for the purposes of recognition and international mobility within Europe.

Recognition of the qualification and title are generally not specifically incorporated into national law.

== Ireland and the UK ==
In Ireland and the United Kingdom, the Chartered Engineer or Incorporated Engineer qualification is a prerequisite requirement for an application for the EUR ING title. In the United Kingdom the Privy Council has approved the use of the title, which can be displayed on a British passport.

== France ==
In France, it is the association Engineers and Scientists of France (IESF) which manages the applications for the attribution of the title of European Engineer (EUR ING) with Engineers Europe. The French engineering degree (Diplôme d’ingénieur) is a Bac+5 qualification accredited by the state and, under French law, confers the grade of master, which certifies its formal equivalence to a Master’s degree; this level of qualification is typically required for the EUR ING application.

== Germany ==
In Germany for the application of EUR ING, a Bachelors and master's degree in engineering is required along with the relevant training and experience consisting of the seven years formation required by Engineers Europe. Qualified engineers must also be a member of an engineering association such as VDI, VDE or another member of German Association of Technical and Academic Societies (DVT), the technical and scientific association representing professional engineering in Germany.

== Belgium ==
In Belgium a Master of Engineering degree together with further years of postgraduate experience and training is typically required for the application of the EUR ING title. This is achieved through the Committee of Belgian Engineers (Comité des Ingénieurs Belges, CIBIC).

In the French-speaking part of Belgium (Wallonia), the Agency for the Evaluation of the Quality of Higher Education (AEQES) is an independent public agency responsible for assessing the quality of higher education programmes within the Wallonia-Brussels Federation, contributing to the overall quality assurance context in which engineering programmes are evaluated.

== Spain ==
The Spanish engineering degree (Máster Universitario en Ingeniería), awarded after at least five years of higher education, corresponds to a Bac+5 master’s degree and is recognised at EQF Level 7, which is typically required as the educational basis for the EUR ING application.

== Greece ==
In Greece a Master of Science in Engineering (5-year course leading to a Diploma/Dipl.Ing) from a university together with at least two further years of postgraduate experience and training in relevant roles as an Engineer is typically required for the application of the EUR ING title. This is achieved through the Technical Chamber of Greece (Τεχνικό Επιμελητήριο Ελλάδος, ΤΕΕ) after an application and examination of all required specifications.

== Other countries ==
In addition to the countries explicitly described above, the European Engineer title is also available in a wide range of other member nations of Engineers Europe. Each participating country applies the common EUR ING competence framework while maintaining its own national procedures for assessing academic formation, professional experience, and continuing development. As a result, the recognition process and specific documentation requirements may vary, but the overall standards for granting the title remain consistent across Europe. Engineers Europe continues to expand cooperation with additional national engineering bodies, ensuring that the EUR ING designation is broadly portable and aligned with up to date international best practices.

== Academic level and professional competence ==
Although the EUR ING title certifies that an engineer has completed education that meets the requirements of the Bologna Second Cycle (EQF Level 7, master’s degree level) and has additionally demonstrated several years of supervised professional practice, responsibility and peer-reviewed competence, employers sometimes overlook the equivalence to a master’s degree. Some recruitment processes rely primarily on formal academic credentials alone, and may not consider professional qualifications that integrate advanced education with assessed and verified, peer reviewed competence. This can lead to situations where holders of an academic master’s degree, but with little or no professional experience, align with job requirements more easily than candidates with professional titles that include both master's-level education and demonstrable engineering capability and competence. The issue is discussed in the context of international mobility and professional recognition frameworks.

Several studies and policy papers in engineering education have noted that reliance solely on academic degrees does not always reflect an engineer’s real professional capability, and that competence-based, peer-reviewed professional frameworks are increasingly emphasised in international mobility systems. Professional qualifications such as EUR ING, which integrate both master’s-level education and assessed engineering practice, are referenced in these discussions as part of a broader shift toward outcome-based and competence-driven recognition models in the engineering profession.

In this context, professional titles such as EUR ING serve as complete, terminal professional qualifications in engineering, which provide a holistic capstone for full professional competence beyond an academic master's degree alone.

== See also ==
- Regulation and licensure in engineering
- British professional qualifications
- European Chemist
- European professional qualification directives
- Professional Engineer
- Master of Engineering
- Master of Science in Engineering
