= Royal Netherlands Chemical Society =

Koninklijke Nederlandse Chemische Vereniging
- Formation: 1903
- Type: Learned society
- Headquarters: The Hague
- Location: Netherlands
- Members: 7,400
- Official language: Dutch
- Chairperson: Prof.dr. Matthias Bickelhaupt
- Website: www.kncv.nl

The Royal Netherlands Chemical Society (In Dutch: Koninklijke Nederlandse Chemische Vereniging, abbreviated: KNCV) is a learned society and professional association founded in 1903 to represent the interests of chemists and chemical engineers in the Netherlands. Currently the organisation has approximately 7,400 members.

The organisation supports the professional development of its members who are involved in the fields of chemistry, life sciences and process technology. The organisation is actively involved in protecting the interests of its members. Furthermore, its supports the development and spread of knowledge and inspiration in the field of chemistry. It publishes journals, books and databases, as well as hosting conferences, seminars and workshops.

== History ==
In the years of 1896 and 1897, two Dutch chemists Willem Paulinus Jorissen and Johannes Rutten made plans to found an Association of Dutch Chemists. Rutten (1873-1946) had obtained the degree of technologist at the Polytechnic School in Delft (now Delft University of Technology) in 1896 and was appointed chemist at the former Central Guanofabrieken (now AkzoNobel) at Kralingseveer in Rotterdam. Jorissen obtained his PhD degree at the University of Amsterdam on 21 oktober 1896 with Hendrik Willem Bakhuis Roozeboom as supervisor. Rutten and Jorissen became friends and discussed the possibilities of organizing the Dutch chemists. There were already chemical associations in neighboring countries for a long time: the Chemical Society in London was founded in 1841, the Société chimique de France in 1857, the Deutsche Chemische Gesellschaft zu Berlin in 1867 and the American Chemical Society in 1876. Denmark followed in 1879, Sweden in 1883, Finland in 1891 and Norway in 1893, while the Société Chimique de Belge was established in Brussels in 1887.

In order to successfully establish a Dutch chemical association, it was first of all necessary to find out whether a sufficient number of members could be counted on. Following the medical yearbook for the Netherlands published since 1882, the two friends published a chemical yearbook in 1898 that contained an address list of Dutch chemists at home and abroad. The editors consisted of Jorissen, Rutten, the Amsterdam pharmacist and chemist Bernardus Adrianus van Ketel (1862-1928), H.C. Prinsen Geerligs (born 1864), director of the sugar cane testing station in Kagok, Tegal (Java), and Dr. Lodewijk Theodorus Reicher (1857-1943), chemical mechanic at the Municipal Health Service in Amsterdam and chief of the associated chemical laboratory. The second volume appeared in 1901; the third in 1902. The editorial board was expanded with Dr. Albert Jacques Joseph van de Velde (1871-1956), director of the city laboratory in Ghent. The title therefore became: Scheikundig Jaarboekje voor Nederland, België en Nederlands Indië (English: Chemical Yearbook for the Netherlands, Belgium and the Dutch East Indies). In the meantime, the Journal of Applied Chemistry and Hygiene was founded in 1897 of which Jorissen became co-editor. The chemical yearbook and the journal would play a major role in the founding of the Dutch Chemical Association.

The society was founded on 15 April 1903 as the "Algemene Nederlandsche Chemische Vereeniging" (English: General Netherlands Chemical Society), and renamed on 4 July of the same year as "Nederlandsche Chemische Vereeniging" (English: Netherlands Chemical Society). At the jubilee of 1953, the organisation was granted a Royal Charter (with the designation "Koninklijke") by Queen Juliana of the Netherlands and thereby became the "Koninklijke Nederlandse Chemische Vereniging" (English: Royal Netherlands Chemical Society).

== Membership ==
Membership is open to anyone who works or studies in the chemistry, life sciences or process technology, and endorses the core values for chemists. The board decides on the admission of the members.

The society does have the following categories of membership:

- Student Member: Student membership is available for a reduced rate to those who are enrolled at a Dutch college or university as bachelor or master student in chemistry, life sciences or process technology.
- Member: Ordinary membership is open to those working in the fields of chemistry, life sciences or process technology, or/and have graduated in these areas from a Dutch college or university.
- Honorary Member: During anniversary years or in special occasions, the society may grant the honorary membership as reward to persons who have rendered special service to the KNCV, to the chemistry community in the Netherlands or Europe, or to chemical sciences in general.
- Member of Special Merit: Members who have made special contributions to the society through exceptional service or distinctive merit displayed over several years can be appointed ‘member of special merit’ on recommendation by the Board.
- European Chemist (EurChem): The KNCV is one of the member societies of the European Chemical Society (EuChemS) and can as such grant this designation to chemists.

== Sections and associations ==
The society is organised around 17 sections and associations that are based on subject areas, work groups, and local circles across the Netherlands. The sections and associations cover broad areas of chemistry but also contain many special interest groups for more specific areas:

- Section Analytical Chemistry: for analytical chemistry and promoting the interests of the analytical-chemical stakeholders and interested parties in the Netherlands.
- Section Catalysis (also named 'Dutch Catalysis Society'): representing those active in the field of Catalysis in the Netherlands.
- Section Chemistry Education (SSO): for those active in the areas of chemistry education.
- Section Environmental Chemistry: representing those working in the area of environmental chemistry.
- Section Macromolecules: representing those active in the field of polymer science.
- Section Medicinal Chemistry: for everyone involved in medicinal chemistry research.
- Section Nanostructures and Self-Assembly (NSA): for those active in the field nanostructures and investigating self-assembly of nanoparticles.
- Section Nuclear Chemistry: for everyone involved in the field of radiochemistry.
- Section Organic Chemistry (SOC): representing those active in the field of organic chemistry.
- Dutch Association for Crystal Growth (NVKG): for those in the field of crystallography and researching crystal growth.
- Dutch Biotechnology Association (NBV): the professional association for all professionals in the field of applied life sciences.
- Dutch Crystallographic Society (NVK): for anyone in (or from) the Netherlands and Flanders who is interested in crystallography.
- Netherlands Ceramics Society (NKV): aimed at the transfer of knowledge and experience in the field of scientific, technical and economic issues concerning ceramic materials and products.
- Netherlands Proces Technologists (NPT): community in the Netherlands in the field of process engineering.
- Netherlands Society for Biochemistry and Molecular Biology (NVBMB): representing those working in the area of biochemistry and molecular biology.
- Netherlands Society for Mass Spectrometry: the association in the Netherlands for everyone involved in mass spectrometry.
- Network For Food Experts (NVVL): professional association for food experts in the Netherlands and everyone working in the field of food sciences.

There are six local circles covering the Netherlands, i.e. that of 's-Hertogenbosch, Utrecht, Zwolle, Groningen, Haarlem, and Rotterdam.
