= Institute of Chemistry Ceylon =

Chemistry school in Sri Lanka

- Focus: Chemistry
- President: Prof. (Mrs.) S.E. Ekanayake: B.Sc. (Peradeniya), M.Phil., Ph.D. (Lund, Sweden), C.Chem., F.I.Chem.C. Professor of Chemistry, Department of Biochemistry, University of Sri Jayewardenepura
- Key people: Mr. N. M. S. Hettigedara: Grad. Chem., M.Sc. (Kelaniya), C.Chem., F.I.Chem.C., M.R.A.C.I, M.N.S., M.H.S.M, F.R.S.H. Nutritionist /Superintendent of Police, Police Hospital (Vice President)
- Formerly called: Chemical Society of Ceylon
- Location: 341/22 Welikada, Rajagiriya, Sri Jayawardenapura Kotte, Sri Lanka
- Coordinates: 6.909428°N 79.893427°E
- Interactive map of Institute of Chemistry Ceylon
- Website: ichemc.edu.lk

The Institute of Chemistry Ceylon is the successor to the Chemical Society of Ceylon (founded 1941) and was established in the year 1971 for the general advancement of the science and practice of chemistry. It is a nonprofit organization, learned society catering to the Chemical Sciences as well as a professional, qualifying and examination body looking after and responsible for the maintenance and enhancement of the profession of Chemistry in Sri Lanka. It is the oldest such body in any branch of the basic in sciences in Sri Lanka. The Golden Jubilee of the institute was held in 1991 & the Diamond Jubilee in 2001. The Institute of Chemistry Ceylon was incorporated by Act of Parliament No. 15 of 1972.

== History ==
Chemistry was taught as a pre-medical subject at Ceylon as early as 1900 in Ceylon. Later it was taught at the Ceylon Technical College for medical students and students taking the external general degree examination of the University of London. The University College in Ceylon was established in January 1921. With the establishment of the University College as an institution for graduate studies, chemistry was one of the science departments, set up under the Headship of Mr. W. Rae. With Mr. L. P. C. Chandrasena joining Mr. Rae, courses for the London External Degree Examination in B.Sc. (General) and B.Sc. (Special) were started.

At that period of time, there were the three Research Institutes set up by the colonial regime; Tea Research Institute, Rubber Research Institute and Coconut Research Institute. Besides, there were the Department of Agriculture, the Agricultural Research Institute and the Government Analyst's Department. Except for the University College and the Government Analyst's Department, the organisations were not in Colombo.

Mr. D. H. Balfour with chemistry as a subject in his Tripos from Cambridge University, joined the Ceylon Civil Service. He felt that there were possibilities of starting chemical industries in Ceylon. He convinced the Minister of Industries, Mr. C. G. S Corea and obtained a Treasury Grant to carry out research. He set up the Industrial Research Laboratory where chemistry graduates initially worked before they found suitable employment.

During the Second World War, when many of the essential items were scarce or were not available, Ceylon decided to produce some of these essential items. The factories were set up not in the main city but at a fair distance from the city. Chemists were appointed to these factories and these chemists would not have personal contacts.

In 1940, the chemists engaged in different chemical fields such as university teaching, chemical research, analytical chemistry and forensic chemistry. Those working in these factories felt the need to have a Society of their own, to meet and exchange views and discuss current problems. There was a need for professional interaction. Dr. N. G. Baptist and Dr. A. A. Hoover approached Prof. A. Kandiah, Professor of Chemistry, University College in Ceylon, with a proposal to start an Association. Prof. Kandiah showed some reluctance at first but later realising the importance of having an association agreed to the proposal. May be, he was cautious as Ceylon was still a colony under the British rule.

The government employed many of the chemists and permission had to be obtained from the Government for these chemists to be members of such an Association. Dr. Hoover addressed a letter to the Chief Secretary on 19 December 1940, seeking permission for the formation of the Chemical Society. The letter gave the objectives of the society and names of likely office bearers. The Chief Secretary by his letter No. HB 4/41 of 23 January 1941, informed the Registrar, Medical College through whom the application was sent, that there was no objection to Dr. Hoover or any Public Officer becoming a member or holding office in such a society provided the objectives were purely scientific and did not involve them in any breach of Public Service Regulations.

As a result of these activities, a meeting of all interested in the formation of the Chemical Society, comprising about 35 chemists working in different fields, met on 25 January 1941, in the Chemistry Lecture Theater of University College and the Chemical Society was inaugurated. This was indeed a historic event and arguably marks the first ever beginning of the organisation within the basic sciences in this country.

The conveners sought the help and cooperation of the senior chemists from the Agricultural Department (Dr. A. W. R. Joachim), the Tea Research Institute (Dr. A. Norris), the Rubber Research Institute (Mr. T. O'Brien), the Coconut Research Institute (Dr. R. Child), the Department of Industries (Mr. D. H. Balfour), The Government Analyst's Department (Mr. W. R. Chanmugam) and the Salt Department (Mr. C. E. Foenander).

=== Chemical Society Ceylon ===
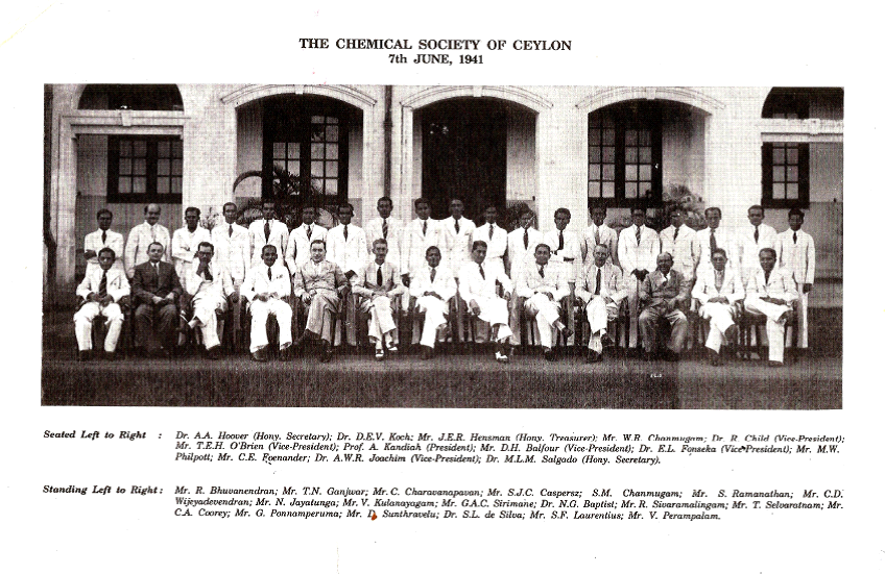
The group photograph of the members who were present at the first meeting

The first Meeting of the Ceylon Chemical Society was held on 7 June 1941, when members were elected as office bearers of the Society. Prof. A. Kandiah was elected as the President and Dr. A. A. Hoover and Dr. M. L. M. Salgado as Honorary Secretaries. Five members were elected as Vice Presidents namely, Dr. R. Child, Dr. A. W. R. Joachim, Dr. E. L. Fonseka, Mr. D. H. Balfour and Mr. T. E. H. O'Brien.

The objectives of the Chemical Society, Ceylon were cultivate and promote the cause of chemical sciences by all practical means and raise the status and advance the interests of the Profession of Chemistry in Ceylon.

=== Formation of the Institute of Chemistry, Ceylon ===
The formation of a professional body of chemists was first discussed at the Annual General Meeting of the Chemical Society on December 13, 1968. A committee was given the task of preparing the constitution for formation of Institute of Chemistry, Ceylon based on the Constitution of the Royal Institute of Chemistry, UK and the Institution of Engineers, Ceylon in August 1970. The draft constitution for the formation of the Institute of Chemistry, Ceylon was finalised.

At a Special General Meeting held on July 5, 1971, the following resolution was passed. “The Chemical Society of Ceylon resolves to reconstitute itself into a body here-in-after called and known as the Institute of Chemistry, Ceylon". Dr. M. A. V. Devanathan was elected as the first President of the Institute of Chemistry, Ceylon.

The Incorporation Bill was presented by Mr. Mahinda Rajapaksa, M. P. for Beliatta and Mr. Wilfred Sennanayake, M. P. for Homagama for adaption by Parliament. The Institute of Chemistry, Ceylon was then incorporated by the Act of Parliament No.15 of 1972, the effective date of assent being April 28, 1972.

The objectives of the Institute are given in several clauses in the Act. The institute is to be a Professional and Academic Institution with the purpose to promote and advance the science of chemistry and to promote the education of chemistry at all levels and assist the Private Sector and the Public Sector in all aspects and look after the interests of chemists in general.

The Institute of Chemistry, Ceylon is now a professional qualifying body and a learned society. The institute has been established for the general advancement of the science and practice of chemistry and the enhancement of the status of the profession of chemistry in Sri Lanka.

The Institute represents all branches of the profession and its membership is recognized by the government and its qualification, particularly the Graduateship Certificate (GIC) is accepted by the private and public sector organisations. The Royal Society of Chemistry, UK and the Royal Australian Chemical Institute have accepted the GIC qualification for admission to their societies. Besides, many universities in Sri Lanka and in foreign countries have accepted the qualification for the students to continue their postgraduate studies in their universities.

The Institute reached the above recognition by planned series of activities.

== The Laboratory Technicians Training Course ==
There was a great need to have Middle level personnel like laboratory technician in many laboratories involved in teaching, research, services and quality assurance activities. In 1973, trained personnel available laboratory technician were the Medical Laboratory Technicians (MLT). MLT were recruited by the Health Department and they were trained for a period of two years and then they were attached to hospitals and other medical institutions.

The Institute started a training course with a syllabus in basic chemistry and subjects in some specialised areas so that these technicians could fit into any laboratory. The syllabus was revised periodically. Then in 1998, the Laboratory Technicians Certificate course was upgraded to a Diploma Course (DLTC). By then, there were about 600 technicians trained. Those who underwent this training could apply to follow the GIC course. Some have done that and now they are graduate chemists. Up to 2015 the number of qualified chemical technicians the institute has produced is 1,026. Eighty qualified as chemical technicians in 2015.

== Graduateship Course in Chemistry ==
The need for a course in chemistry equivalent to a four-year special degree in chemistry provided by the universities was considered by the Institute Council. 1970s were a period, when admissions to the universities in Sri Lanka were becoming more and more competitive. Many students with good grades at the G.C.E (Advanced) level examination failed to enter the universities because of the system of admissions. There were also students, who entered the universities but were unable to do a special four-year course in chemistry because the number of places available for such course was limited in the university. There were also many in the industry who wanted to follow a course in chemistry to enhance their career. The Royal Society of Chemistry (RSC) had several courses that helped many who wanted to qualify while working.

With the decision to start this Graduate course, the Council successfully negotiated with Aquinas College of Higher Studies (ACHS), where the Institutes Licentiate Technician Training Course (LTTC) was already functioning, to conduct the Graduate in Chemistry Course PART I on Friday evenings, full day on Saturday and Sunday morning. Based on the request, ACHS advertised the Part 1 course with the course fees fixed by them. Out of 175 applications received, 72 were selected by the Institute appointed selection committee. With permission obtained from the universities, the lecturers from the universities conducted these classes. The management was with ACHS. Part I course proceeded without any problem.

The time to start the Part II and the chemistry practicals, the Institute approached ACHS with the proposals. For some unexplained reasons, in 1980 ACHS agreed to complete the two-year Part I course but refused to continue the Part II and the practicals.

The council did not understand the reason behind this refusal and the council was in serious trouble. They could not let the first batch of 72 students down. There were members in the council who were very critical of the officials for starting a programme of this nature without a detailed study. But a programme of this nature may never have commenced if every possible problem had to be cleared. Now it was not a time to find faults but jointly find a solution. Many members decided to find a suitable solution. Looking for another avenue for conducting the course was the easier way of solving the problem. The office bearers in the council visited schools and teaching establishments with laboratory facilities. They visited Zahira College, Visaka Vidalaya, Stafford Ladies College, Pembroke Academy and St. Thomas College, Mount Lavinia.

Institute decided to discuss the subject of starting the courses with St. Thomas College (STC). The Board of Governors of this college agreed to allow the use of the new science building and the laboratory to conduct our classes. The Council of the Institute of Chemistry was grateful to the Warden Mr. l. C. Illangovan, Bishop Swinthin Fernando, chairman of the Board of Governors, Mr. G. A. C. Sirimanne, Secretary to the Board and other members of St. Thomas Board of Governors.

Finding a suitable, good avenue was a great success to the institute. STC provided the Institute the necessary infrastructure and resources but the college was not agreeable to run the programme in a manner similar to that at ACHS. The Institute had to manage programme like taking over the administration and financial arrangement. STC provided a Coordinator (a science teacher) and staff for laboratory and classrooms. All the staff had to be remunerated by the institute.

Having been able to get a venue to run the programme, the Institute had to plan various other activities like management of the course, to see everything went according to a set plan.

== BSc Honours in Chemical Science ==
From 2020 onwards, College of Chemical Sciences started offering Bachelor of Science Honours degree programme in Chemical Science where Applied Management is offered as a minor. The degree programme is recognized by the University Grants Commission, Sri Lanka.

== Educational Committee ==
The Institute took over the complete management of the Graduate programme from January 1981. In order to place the programme in sound footing, the Council created an Educational Committee that would specifically promote education and academic affairs on behalf of the council. The Educational Committee took over the duties to promote education, training and other academic affairs in addition to other management needs. The Educational Committee received the fees and deposited it as a separate account with the approval of the council. Once there was a misunderstanding about the utilisation of this fund, whether the fund could be used by council activities such as holding of international conferences or seminars. It was decided by the council in July 1981, "Educational fund and Graduate courses money must be utilised as decided by the Educational Committee". However, a part of the Registration fees was given to the General Institute account for the management by the institute.

The Educational Committee functioned well and courses were managed by the appointment of Coordinators to each course. The committee looked into the course content and made necessary changes and introduced several optional courses.

In January 2001, the Diamond Jubilee year of the Chemical Society and its successor the Institute of Chemistry, the College of Chemical Sciences was inaugurated with the view to increasing the activities and obtaining recognition as an Educational Institution. At the Council meeting of June 1, 2001, the rules of the College Chemical Sciences were approved and adopted at the subsequent Annual General Meeting of the institute.

== The New Building ==
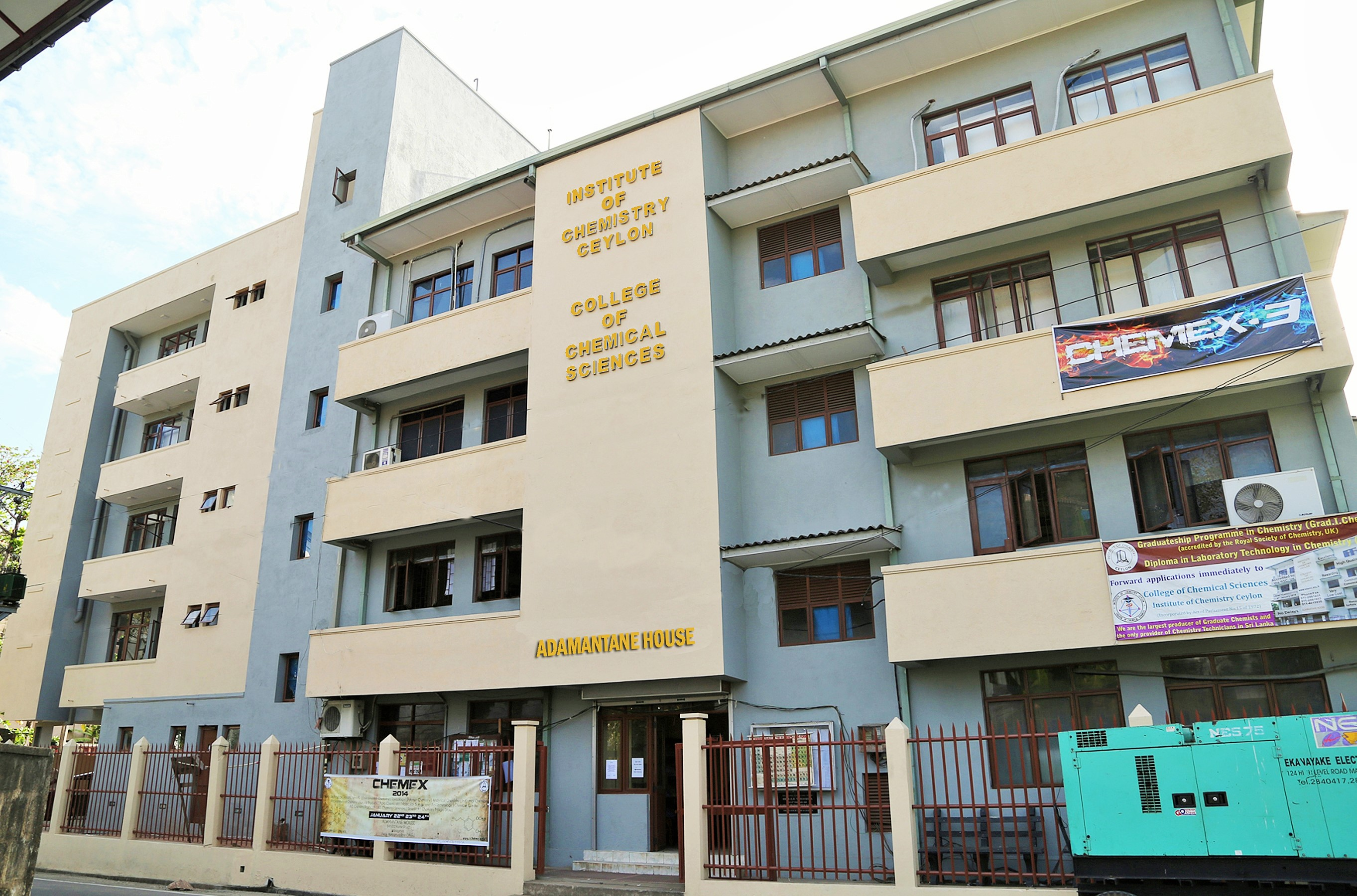
The new building of the Institute

Chemical Society and then the Institute of Chemistry until 1977 had no office or staff. All the activities were looked after by the chairman and officials. The need for building to conduct the activities was felt badly and various efforts were made to have a building. In the meantime, in 1981, the Sri Lanka Association for Advancement of Science (SLAAS) agreed to rent a small room in their building. The Institute for the first time employed a full-time clerk typist and a retired store keeper as Office and Course Assistant. Later, they were able to get a larger space to accommodate increased staff and greater activities.

Finally after great efforts, the Institute obtained a land in Rajagiriya and built a Headquarters building and named it as Adamantane House. The building

with about 20,000 square foot of floor space has an auditorium, lecture theatres, large library space, laboratories, instrument room, Board room and staff rooms. All lectures and practicals of the courses are conducted in the building.

== Logo ==
The Logo of the Institute contains the structure of Adamantane, which is a stable molecule that was synthesized in 1941, the founding year of the institute's predecessor, the Chemical Society of Ceylon.

== Grades of Membership of the Institute ==
=== Corporate Membership ===
Full membership of the institute is referred to as Corporate Membership and consists of two grades, i.e. FELLOW (F.I.Chem.C.) and MEMBER (M.I.Chem.C.).

=== Non–Corporate membership ===
Non–Corporate membership consists of four grades, (two of which are transitional form of membership), which are open for application by individuals. These are ASSOCIATE (A.I.Chem.C.) & LICENTIATE (L.I.Chem.C.). The third grade of non corporate membership is called AFFILIATE and is open to any one who shows a genuine interest in the Chemical Sciences.

The fourth non – corporate grade of membership is referred to as Honorary Fellow (Hon.F.I.Chem.C.). It is the responsibility of the council to elect Honorary Fellows after considering nominations made by Fellows of the institute. In November 2001, the Institute conferred Honorary Fellowships on Datuk Dr Mohinder Singh (Malaysia), Mr C P de Silva and Prof P P G L Siriwardene. Also Dr A.G. Ashmore (RSC, UK), Prof A P de Silva, Dr R O B Wijesekara, Professor Arjuna Aluwihare, Professor Dayantha Wijeyesekera, Dr. Kingsley de Silva & Professor Atta-ur-Rahman were conferred Honorary Fellowships in 2003, 2006, 2007, 2007, 2009, 2013 & 2014 respectively.

The grades of Fellow, Member and Associate have been recognised and accepted by the Government of Sri Lanka as alternate qualifications to the parallel grades of Fellow (FRSC), Member (MRSC) and Associate (AMRSC) respectively of the Royal Society of Chemistry, UK for the purposes of recruitment and promotion of Chemists (Vide Establishment Circular No. 234 of 9–3–77)

== Chartered Chemist (C. Chem.) ==
A Member or Fellow or an experienced practicing Chemist seeking the award of the designation of Chartered Chemist shall need to demonstrate a high level of competence and professionalism in the practice of chemistry and show their commitment to maintain their expertise. They will need to have at least five years of professional experience subsequent to a good enhanced first degree or can demonstrate an equivalent level of attainment.

== International Relations ==
At an international level, the institute is a founder member of the Federation of Asian Chemical Societies (FACS, established 1979). Two Executive Committee meetings of FACS have been held in Sri Lanka in 2004 & 2014. It is since 2009 a full member of the International Union of Pure & Applied Chemistry, (IUPAC). Regular contact is maintained with the Royal Society of Chemistry, UK, the Royal Australian Chemical Institute, the American Chemical Society and parallel professional bodies in other countries. The Royal Society of Chemistry, UK co-ordinates the external moderation/ examination of question papers/scripts of the Graduateship Examinations. The Australian National Chemistry Quiz conducted in Sri Lanka by the Royal Australian Chemical Institute for successive years. Students in the Senior Division who answer all questions correctly are annually awarded scholarships to follow the entire Graduateship Programmes free of charge.

== Annual Sessions ==
Annual sessions are a principal annual activity of the Institute of Chemistry Ceylon which is conducted every June and enables members to present their research papers at technical sessions. The Annual Session commences with a formal Ceremonial Inauguration, during which the out going President delivers a Presidential Address and the Annual Awards of the Institute are presented. The Annual General Meeting of the institute, at which the council for the next year is elected, is also held after the Ceremonial Inauguration. Award Addresses and Memorial Lectures are also delivered during the Annual Session. Each Annual Session usually has a Theme designated by the President. A Theme Seminar based on the theme is usually conducted to emphasize the areas covered by the theme. More recently it has become the practice to invite a number of foreign scientists to participate in the theme seminar which has tended in recent years to become a bigger event than a mere theme seminar as in the past. In line with these developments regional /international seminars have been conducted from 2005. This activity reached a peak with the conduct of a fully organized international conference called CHEMTECH in 2007 as part of its 36th Annual Sessions. Another International Conference on the theme “Role of Chemistry Research in National Development” was held in June 2012 as part of the 41st Annual Sessions.

The Annual Dinner of the institute is conducted jointly with the Sri Lanka Section of the Royal Society of Chemistry at the end of every annual session. The new President of the institute is formally inducted into his office by the out going President during the Annual Dinner.

== Other Activities ==
The Institute of Chemistry Ceylon conducts various professional academic and dissemination activities every year. These include Quiz competitions and Titration Competition amongst school children, Lectures, Orations, Training Seminars, Exhibitions, Industrial visits & Social activities.

=== CHEMEX exhibitions ===
CHEMEX I was held with the global recognition given to Chemistry by the United Nations Organization in 2011 when the year was declared as the International Year of Chemistry. A grand exhibition CHEMEX 2011 and trade fair was organized by the Institute under the theme “Wonders of Chemistry”. The exhibition was held from 27th – 30 January 2011 at the BMICH.

The as a continuation of the project the Institute conducted CHEMEX II in the year 2012 followed by CHEMEX III in the year 2014 both within the Institute premises at Rajagiriya both of which were huge successes.

=== The all Island Chemistry Quiz ===
The all Island Chemistry quiz is for G.C.E (Advance Level) Students. On the basis of the Preliminary written paper the best school in each Province is selected. The best individual performer is selected. The selected schools then contest for the Challenge Shield.

=== The Australian National Chemistry Quiz ===
The Australian National Chemistry Quiz is conducted annually in July by the Royal Australian Chemical Institute in a number of countries especially in Asian Pacific Region. The Australian Organisation provides the question paper, the multiple choice answer sheets and other materials in English. The Sri Lankan organisation took the additional responsibility of translating the question paper to Sinhala and Tamil. Over the years number of districts and number of students have participated in this competition.

=== Inter-school Titration Competition ===
The Institute of Chemistry Ceylon conducts Inter school Titration Competition annually since 2011 with a view to increasing enthusiasm and interest in Chemistry among young generation which is one of the major objective of the International Year of Chemistry (IYC 2011). Another objective is to enhancing the laboratory skills of A/L Science students. The institute provides chemicals, equipments and other laboratory facilities at its Adamantane House as well as the services of well qualified chemists to conduct the above programme. The First National Titration Competition was held from 15 – 21 November 2011 with the participation of 42 schools. The Second National Titration Competition was held from 26 – 30 November 2012 with the participation of 21 schools. The Third National Titration Competition was held from 30 September to 1 October 2013 with the participation of 18 schools. An additional titration competition was held at the University of Jaffna on 22 March 2013 in which about 180 students from the schools in the Northern Province participated. The National Titration Competition is held with the consent of the Ministry of Education, and therefore, all the relevant Government schools in the island are able to participate.
