= Chemical Society of Nigeria =

The Chemical Society of Nigeria is the professional organisation supporting the chemical sciences in Nigeria and a learned society promoting the science and practice of chemistry.

The Pan Africa Chemistry Network has a center of excellence in analytical chemistry in Nigeria.
