= Pan Africa Chemistry Network =

African chemistry organisation

- Formation: London: 21 November 2007; 18 years ago Nairobi: 27 May 2008; 18 years ago
- Region served: Africa
- Parent organization: Royal Society of Chemistry
- Affiliations: University of Lagos, Procter & Gamble, Syngenta
- Website: panafricachemistrynetwork.com

The Pan Africa Chemistry Network (PACN) connects chemists across Africa. It was launched in London on 21 November 2007 and in Nairobi on 27 May 2008 by the Royal Society of Chemistry. The PACN works to connect chemists across Africa and has five centres of excellence in analytical chemistry in Kenya, Ethiopia, Ghana and Nigeria.

The aim of the PACN is:

To enable a self-sustaining science base in Africa and to enhance the number of skilled scientists in Africa through networking, skills development and knowledge creation to support an increase in scientific output and its application to challenges.

In partnership with Syngenta, who donated £1 million over five years three PACN Centres of Excellence in Analytical Chemistry were established in Kenya, Ghana and Ethiopia.

Since December 2011, Procter & Gamble have been working with the PACN and leading scientists and students to exchange knowledge, enhance skills and generate opportunities for innovation in the areas of hygiene, health and waste management. A Collaboration Lab at the University of Lagos in Nigeria was established which includes provision of analytical equipment and internships for Nigerian scientists to apply their knowledge to real life industry challenge.

The PACN organises a number of events including an annual congress, GC-MS training and scientific symposia.
