= International Federation of Societies of Cosmetic Chemists =

- Formation: September 8, 1959; 66 years ago
- Headquarters: New York City
- Members: 51 societies representing 81 countries, 16,000 individual members
- President: Tony Gough
- Website: ifscc.org

International Federation of Societies of Cosmetic Chemists (IFSCC) is an international association based in New York City that promotes international cooperation in cosmetic science and technology. The Federation was founded in Brussels, Belgium in 1959 and had its headquarters in London before moving to New York in 2015. IFSCC is the world's largest association of researchers in the field of cosmetics, and as of 2023 the Federation consists of 51 societies representing 81 countries.

== History ==
The initiative to establish the International Federation of Societies of Cosmetic Chemists (IFSCC) was proposed in Paris in 1956. On April 15, 1959, the first council meeting to form the IFSCC was held in London, during which representatives from eight countries attended, including Belgium, Denmark, France, Germany, Great Britain, Norway, Sweden and the United States (the Society of Cosmetic Chemists).

On September 8, 1959, IFSCC was founded in Brussels, Belgium. The first IFSCC president was Maison G. de Navarre from the United States. In 1960, the first IFSCC Congress was held in Munich, Germany with 350 delegates attending from 16 countries.

IFSCC had its headquarters in London, England for over three decades, and in 2015 the organization moved its headquarters to New York, USA. As of 2023, IFSCC consists of 51 societies representing 81 countries, and the number of individual members in the Federation exceeds 16,000.

== Mission ==
The role of IFSCC includes promoting international standards, funding researches, coordinating international congresses and meetings, issuing scientific publications, and sponsoring awards of cosmetic sciences. Since 1998, IFSCC publishes the journal IFSCC Magazine. The Federation also offers the database KOSMET, a comprehensive online database specializing in Cosmetic Science and Industry information.

== IFSCC events ==
Before 2023, IFSCC organized an international scientific event each autumn: a Congress in even years, a Conference in odd years. Starting in 2023, only the IFSCC Congress is offered annually.

- The past three IFSCC Congresses were held in London (32nd Congress; 2022), in Tokyo (31st Congress; 2020), and in Munich (30th Congress; 2018). The first IFSCC Congress was held in Munich in 1960.
- The past three IFSCC Conferences were held in Cancún (26th Conference; 2021), in Milan (25th Conference; 2019), and in Seoul (24th Conference; 2017). The first IFSCC Conference was held in Basel in 1979.

== IFSCC awards ==
All eligible papers for the IFSCC Awards are judged by a committee of qualified and experienced cosmetic scientists, according to criteria "Novelty and originality of the experimental approach", "The impact of the experimental findings for the cosmetic industry at large", and "The extent to which the results provide an answer to as yet unresolved scientific matters". Presentation of the results is also being judged.

The following awards are given at an IFSCC Congress in even years:

- Basic Research Award (for upstream research studies)
- Applied Research Award (for downstream studies closed linked to final cosmetic products)
- Poster Award
- Henry Maso Award for Young Scientists

The following awards were given at an IFSCC Conference (in odd years) before 2023 and are given at an IFSCC Congress since 2023 in odd years:

- Poster Award
- Johann Wiechers Award (formerly the IFSCC Conference Award)
- Host Society Award
- Maison G. de Navarre Young Scientist Essay Prize

== See also ==
- Society of Cosmetic Chemists
- Cosmetic industry
- Journal of Cosmetic Dermatology
