= Japan Association for International Chemical Information =

The Japan Association for International Chemical Information (JAICI) (一般社団法人化学情報協会, ippan shadanhoujin kagaku jouhou kyoukai) is a nonprofit organization in Tokyo, Japan. It indexes chemical information and translates abstracts between Japanese and English. It works in collaboration with the Chemical Abstracts Service (CAS) in Columbus, Ohio.

JAICI was founded with the help of Hideaki Chihara in 1971. It succeeded an earlier organization, the Japanese CA Abstractors' Association, which was started in 1954.
