= European Chemist =

Professional designation for chemists

European Chemist (EurChem) is an international professional qualification awarded by the European Chemist Registration Board (ECRB) of the European Chemical Society (EuChemS) for chemists, for use in many European countries. Through the European Chemist designation, the chemical societies in the European Union (EU) have ensured that there is an easily understood title to indicate a high level of competence in the practice of chemistry. The award of EurChem assists individual chemists who are moving from one employer to another in different EU member states, receiving equal treatment across the Union.

EurChem Candidates must meet the following requirements:

- Be a member of a participating national chemical society;
- Hold a degree accredited by the participating national chemical society;
- Have at least eight years of post-secondary school education/experience including a category-A schedule academic qualification;
- Have at least three years' approved post-graduation professional experience;
- Two referees who must be members of the applicant's national chemical society;
- Show proficient professional experience appearing out of:
  - Able to work in conditions with minor leadership
  - Applying knowledge
  - Consciousness of safety, health, and environment aspects
  - Demonstrate of professional skill
  - Excellent written and oral communications
  - Good people's management, advising, evaluating skills.

The title EurChem is a post-nominal, placed after the name like academic degrees. It is equivalent to national chartered status, e.g. the title Chartered Chemist in the United Kingdom. The ECRB maintains a Register of European Chemists.

Recognition of the qualification and title are generally not specifically incorporated into national law, but in the United Kingdom the Privy Council has approved the use of the title. However, approval is generally only after peer review by the appropriate national chemical society under the EU Directive 89/48/EEC, which exempts a bearer from additional examination in the Union.

== See also ==
- British professional qualifications
- European Engineer
- European professional qualification directives
