= List of Royal Society of Chemistry journals =

This is a list of scientific journals published by the Royal Society of Chemistry.

== A ==
- Analyst (1876–present)
- Analytical Communications (1996–1999)
- Analytical Methods (2009–present)
- Analytical Proceedings (1980–1993)
- Analytical Proceedings including Analytical Communications (1994–1995)
- Annual Reports on Analytical Atomic Spectroscopy (1971–1984)
- Annual Reports on the Progress of Chemistry
  - Annual Reports on the Progress of Chemistry Section A (Inorganic chemistry) (1967–2013)
  - Annual Reports on the Progress of Chemistry Section B (Organic chemistry) (1967–2013)
  - Annual Reports on the Progress of Chemistry Section C (Physical chemistry) (1979–2013)

== B ==
- Biomaterials Science (2013–present)

== C ==
- Catalysis Science & Technology (2011-Present)
- Chemical Communications (1996-Present)
- Chemical Science (2010-Present)
- Chemical Society Reviews (1972-Present)
- Chemical Education Research and Practice (2000-Present)
- Contemporary Organic Synthesis
- CrystEngComm (1999-Present)

== D ==
- Dalton Transactions (2003-Present)
- Digital Discovery (2022-Present)

== E ==
- EES Batteries (2024-present)
- EES Catalysis (2022-present)
- EES Solar (2024-present)
- Energy & Environmental Science (2008–present)
- Energy Advances (2022-Present)
- Environmental Science: Advances (2022-Present)
- Environmental Science: Atmosphere (2021-present)
- Environmental Science: Nano (2014–present)
- Environmental Science: Processes & Impacts (2013–present)
- Environmental Science: Water Research & Technology (2015–present)

== F ==
- Faraday Discussions (1991-Present)
- Food & Function (2010-Present)

== G ==
- Green Chemistry (1999–present)

== I ==
- Industrial Chemistry & Materials (2022-present)
- Integrative Biology (2008–2018) (Now published by Oxford University Press)
- Inorganic Chemistry Frontiers (2014–present)

== J ==
- Journal of Analytical Atomic Spectrometry (1986 - Present)
- Journal of the Chemical Society (1849 - 1996)
  - Journal of the Chemical Society, Abstracts (1878 - 1925)
  - Journal of the Chemical Society, Transactions (1878 - 1925)
  - Journal of the Chemical Society A: Inorganic, Physical, Theoretical (1966 - 1971)
  - Journal of the Chemical Society B: Physical Organic (1966 - 1971)
  - Journal of the Chemical Society C: Organic (1966 - 1971)
  - Journal of the Chemical Society D: Chemical Communications (1969 - 1971)
- Journal of the Chemical Society, Faraday Transactions (1905 - 1971 as Transactions of the Faraday Society; 1990 - 1998)
  - Journal of the Chemical Society, Faraday Transactions I: Physical Chemistry in Condensed Phases (1972 - 1989)
  - Journal of the Chemical Society, Faraday Transactions II: Molecular and Chemical Physics (1972 - 1989)
- Journal of Materials Chemistry (1991 - 2012)
  - Journal of Materials Chemistry A (2013 - Present)
  - Journal of Materials Chemistry B (2013 - Present)
  - Journal of Materials Chemistry C (2013 - Present)
- Journal of the Royal Institute of Chemistry (1950 - 1964)

== L ==
- Lab on a Chip (2001–present)

== M ==
- Materials Advances (2020–present)
- Materials Chemistry Frontiers (2017–present)
- Materials Horizons (2014–present)
- MedChemComm (2010–present)
- Molecular Omics (2018–present)
- Molecular Systems Design & Engineering (2015–present)

== N ==
- Nanoscale (2009-Present)
- Nanoscale Advances (2018-Present)
- Nanoscale Horizons (2016-Present)
- Natural Product Reports (1984-Present)
- Natural Product Updates (2002-present)
- New Journal of Chemistry (1998-Present)

== O ==
- Organic and Biomolecular Chemistry (2003-Present)
- Organic Chemistry Frontiers (2014-Present)

== P ==
- Perkin Transactions (1997-2002)
- Photochemical and Photobiological Sciences (2002-present)
- PhysChemComm (1998-2003)
- Physical Chemistry Chemical Physics (1999-Present)
- Polymer Chemistry (2010-Present)
- Proceedings of the Chemical Society (1841-1964)

== R ==
- Reaction Chemistry & Engineering (2016-Present)
- RSC Advances (2011-Present)
- RSC Applied Interfaces (2023-Present)
- RSC Applied Polymers (2023-Present)
- RSC Chemical Biology (2020-Present)
- RSC Medicinal Chemistry (2020-Present)
- RSC Sustainability (2022-Present)

== S ==
- Sensors & Diagnostics (2020-Present)
- Soft Matter (2005–Present)
- Sustainable Energy & Fuels (2017–Present)
- Sustainable Food Technology (2022–Present)
