= Susan Reutzel-Edens =

American chemist

- Born: Susan Marie Reutzel
- Education: University of Minnesota
- Scientific career
- Workplaces: Eli Lilly and Company; Cambridge Crystallographic Data Centre
- Thesis: Hydrogen-bonded imide aggregates : solid-state design, preparation, and characterization by solid-state NMR (1991)

Susan Reutzel-Edens FRSC is an American chemist who is the Head of Science at the Cambridge Crystallographic Data Centre. Her work considers solid state chemistry and pharmaceuticals. She is interested in crystal structure predictions. She serves on the editorial boards of CrystEngComm and Crystal Growth & Design.

== Early life and education ==
Reutzel-Edens was a doctoral researcher at the University of Minnesota, where she studied the design and characterization of hydrogen-bonded imide aggregates. She worked in the laboratory of crystallographer Margaret C. Etter, and made use of solid state NMR. During her doctorate, she investigated how hydrogen bonds could be used as design elements that guided the solid-state self assembly of organic molecules. She made use of the Cambridge Structural Database to unravel the complicated relationships between hydrate formation and crystal polymorphism.

== Research and career ==
Reutzel-Edens joined Eli Lilly and Company, where she recognized that it would be challenging to identify and design increasingly complicated drug targets, and instead proposed the use of computation approaches. Through collaborations with the Cambridge Crystallographic Database, Reutzel-Edens founded the Lilly solid form design program. Her research has considered crystal polymorphism and the crystal nucleation. She used computational approaches to identify commercially viable small molecule drug products. To this end, Reutzel-Edens proposed the use of crystal structure prediction to identify pharmaceutical molecules to complement experimental investigations. She has described Olanzapine as “an incredible molecule, a gift to crystal chemistry that keeps on giving,”.

In 2018, Reutzel-Edens was appointed Fellow of the Royal Society of Chemistry. She serves on the editorial boards of CrystEngComm and Crystal Growth and Design. In 2021 Reutzel-Edens joined the Cambridge Crystallographic Database as Head of Science. Through Reutzel-Edens's efforts towards the progression of material science, she has patented 12 US patents for various crystalline compounds under the Eli Lilly and Company from 1995 to 2017 before her retirement in 2021.

== Selected publications ==
- Aurora J Cruz-Cabeza; Susan M Reutzel-Edens; Joel Bernstein (2015). "Facts and fictions about polymorphism". Chemical Society Reviews. 44 (23): 8619–8635. doi:10.1039/c5cs00227c. PMID 26400501. Wikidata Q38591930.
- Stephenson GA; Forbes RA; Reutzel-Edens SM (2001). "Characterization of the solid state: quantitative issues". Advanced Drug Delivery Reviews. 48 (1): 67–90. doi:10.1016/s0169-409x(01)00099-0. PMID 11325477. Wikidata Q34233912.
- Sarah L. Price; Doris E Braun; Susan M Reutzel-Edens (2016). "Can computed crystal energy landscapes help understand pharmaceutical solids?". ChemComm. 52 (44): 7065–7077. doi:10.1039/c6cc00721j. PMC 5486446. PMID 27067116. Wikidata Q38805031.
