= Kumar Biradha =

Indian chemistry professor (born 1968)

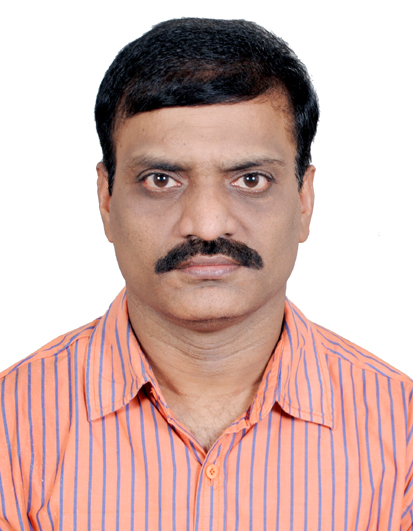
- Born: 15 June 1968 (age 58); India
- Education: D.N.R. College, Andhra University; University of Hyderabad; Saint Mary's University, Canada; Nagoya University.
- Spouse: Satyasri Biradha
- Scientific career
- Fields: Supramolecular chemistry, Crystal Engineering
- Workplaces: Indian Institute of Technology, Kharagpur
- Doctoral advisor: Gautam Radhakrishna Desiraju
- Website: www.structuralchemistrylab.com/prof-kumar-biradha

Kumar Biradha is a researcher in the field of crystal engineering. He was born on 15 June 1968 in Relangi, Andhra Pradesh. He is a professor at the Department of Chemistry, Indian Institute of Technology, Kharagpur, and a member of Editorial Advisory board of Crystal Growth & Design, an American Chemical Society Journal.

== Biography ==
Biradha completed his secondary and higher secondary education from TMP High School, Relangi, and SVSS Govt. Junior College, Attili, respectively. He obtained his bachelor's degree from DNR College, Bhimavaram, and soon after that he joined University of Hyderabad to complete his M.Sc. in chemistry in 1991. Subsequently, he earned his Ph.D. in structural chemistry from the same university under the guidance of Professor Gautam Radhakrishna Desiraju in 1996. From there he moved to Canada to work as postdoctoral fellow in the laboratory of Mike Zaworotko at Saint Mary's University, Canada in 1997. There he worked on designing various clay-like and zeolite-like architectures by using strong hydrogen bonds and coordination bonds. In the next year he received the prestigious JSPS fellowship to work with Makoto Fujita at IMS, Okazaki, Japan, and Nagoya University, where he expertized on coordination networks and dynamic porous coordination polymers. There he also appointed as an assistant professor and Researcher up to March 2002. Finally he moved back to India and joined the Chemistry Department at IIT Kharagpur as an assistant professor in 2002 and became a professor in 2014.

== Scientific contributions ==
Biradha's research group aims at synthesizing multi-functional supramolecular materials with the use of distinct crystal engineering strategies. Web of Science has listed over 200 of the published scientific articles by him on Cocrystal, gels, organic polymers, coordination polymers, metal-organic frameworks and covalent organic framework and their potential applications in the fields of electrocatalysis, molecular sensing, solid state [2+2] photo-dimerizations and polymerizations, gas adsorption, inclusion materials, semiconductivity, luminescence, and isomeric hydrocarbon separation. For such significant contributions in science, Biradha featured among 'Top 2% Global scientist' in a study by Stanford Analyst Group under the category of 'Inorganic and Nuclear chemistry'.

== Awards and honors ==
- Editorial Advisory board member of Crystal Growth & Design.
- Served as associate editor, Crystal Growth & Design, American Chemical Society 2012–2021.
- Became Fellow of the Royal Society of Chemistry in 2010.
- Advisory board member of New Journal of Chemistry.
- Served as co-editor for Acta Crystallographica Section E: Crystallographic Communications in 2011.
- He received the NASI-Scopus Young Scientist Award of the Elsevier in chemistry in the year 2006.
