= CrystEngCommunity =

CrystEngCommunity is a virtual web community for people working in the field of crystal engineering. The website is owned by the Royal Society of Chemistry (RSC).

CrystEngCommunity has links to the main international research groups working in crystal engineering; publishes occasional profiles (interviews) of crystal engineers; a conference diary that lists and links to international events in the field of crystal engineering; and a terminology wiki, CrystEngWiki, for crystal engineering.

Also on the community are links to research articles on crystal engineering including CrystEngSelects (a selection of recent articles of interest to crystal engineers from across the RSC journals Chemical Communications, CrystEngComm, Dalton Transactions, Journal of Materials Chemistry, New Journal of Chemistry and Organic & Biomolecular Chemistry); links to special CrystEngComm Discussion conference special issues; and links to past crystal engineering articles from the RSC Journals Archive.

Other useful links include downloadable wallpapers for PC desktops, book reviews and a compilation of useful weblinks for crystal engineers

The community has a particularly close association with the RSC's crystal engineering journal, CrystEngComm.

== See also ==
- CrystEngComm
- Dalton Transactions
