= Rebecca Goss (chemist) =

Professor of organic chemistry

Rebecca Jane Miriam Goss
- Other name: R. J. M. Goss (in publications)
- Education: University of Durham
- Awards: Dorothy Hodgkin Fellowship (2003); Meldola Medal (2006)
- Scientific career
- Institutions: University of St. Andrews; University of Exeter; University of East Anglia; University of Cambridge
- Doctoral advisor: David O'Hagan

Rebecca Jane Miriam Goss is a British organic chemist and professor at the University of St. Andrews recognized for her contributions to discovering and engineering biosynthesis of natural products, particularly anti-infectives, through the integration of synthetic biology and chemistry. Among other achievements and awards, Goss won the 2006 Royal Society of Chemistry Meldola Medal.

== Early life and education ==
Goss completed undergraduate studies in chemistry at University of Durham in 1997. She remained at the University of Durham to undertake a Ph.D. under the supervision of Professor David O'Hagan. She was awarded the Ph.D. in 2001 after studying the stereochemistry of biosynthetic pathways during the formation of various natural products, specifically the enzyme-catalyzed reaction to produce fluoroacetate through fluorination.

== Research and career ==
Goss specializes in the biosynthesis of natural products at the chemical and genetic level.

Goss joined the University of Cambridge in 2000 to study the chemistry and molecular biology of polyketide biosynthesis in the research group of Professors Jim Staunton (FRS) and Peter Leadlay (FRS). She held a one-year teaching fellowship at the School of Chemistry, University of Nottingham between 2002 and 2003 before obtaining a lectureship at the School of Biological and Chemical Science, University of Exeter in 2003. Between 2005 and 2010, Goss held a lectureship at the University of East Anglia before being promoted to senior lecturer in 2010 and then reader in organic chemistry in 2012. Goss moved to the University of St. Andrews in 2012 to become a reader in biomolecular and organic chemistry. In 2018, she became the first woman to be appointed a full professor of organic chemistry in St Andrews' 600-year history.

Through her professorship in biomolecular/organic chemistry at the University of St. Andrews, Goss leads the Goss group, which leads a series of projects working on an array of projects within the field of chemical biology, with natural products as the central focus. One of the key concepts developed by the group is GenoChemetics, which is a unique paradigm in natural product analog generation. This represents a revolutionary approach that combines synthetic biology and synthetic chemistry to address challenges encountered by synthetic chemists. Chemically active motifs within natural products often pose difficulties, leading to side reactions during synthesis. Traditional approaches involve extensive protection of sensitive functionality through protecting groups or avoidance of introducing such motifs until the final stages of synthesis. In contrast, GenoChemetics employs synthetic biology to engineer chemically orthogonal and reactive functionality directly into natural products.

This innovative approach selectively introduces reactive functional handles into specific sites within natural products through the integration of foreign genes into the microorganisms responsible for natural product synthesis, alongside existing biosynthetic processes, and the group is able to activate the core structures of natural products. This activation allows for targeted modification of the natural product core through diverse reactions, leading to the creation of novel analogs with enhanced properties. The Goss Group's research in GenoChemetics marks a significant advancement in natural product synthesis, opening up new avenues for designing and developing bioactive compounds with therapeutic potential.

She was awarded the Royal Society of Chemistry Meldola prize for her work to understand the interface of organic chemistry and molecular biology. In 2013 she was awarded the Royal Society of Chemistry Natural Product Report Emerging Researcher Lectureship for her pioneering approach to 'Genochemetics', which combines synthetic biology and chemistry for medicinal purposes. In 2014 she was awarded an ERC consolidator grant.

Goss is on the advisory board for the peer-reviewed journals Chemical Communications and Natural Product Reports.

== Awards ==
- 2013 Royal Society of Chemistry Natural Product Report Lectureship Award
- 2011 UK's under 40 Organic Chemistry delegate for EuCheM’s Young Investigators Workshop
- 2011 Thieme Chemistry Journal Award
- 2006 Royal Society of Chemistry - Meldola prize
