= Susan Bourne =

South African chemist

- Occupation: Lecturer at the University of Cape Town

Academic background
- Education: University of Cape Town

Academic work
- Discipline: Chemist
- Institutions: University of Cape Town

Susan A. Bourne is a chemist and academic who is a professor of physical chemistry at the University of Cape Town (UCT), where she is the first woman to hold that position.

== Career ==
Bourne obtained her PhD in chemistry from the University of Cape Town, where her research focused on organic inclusion compounds under the supervision of Luigi Nassimbeni. Her research focuses on supramolecular chemistry, crystal engineering, and metal–organic materials.

After completing postdoctoral studies in Texas, United States, she returned to University of Cape Town, where she established an independent research group in supramolecular chemistry and crystal engineering.

She became a full professor in 2008, and was the first woman to be appointed professor of chemistry at the University of Cape Town.

Bourne is a fellow of the Royal Society of Chemistry and the African Academy of Sciences. She has served as chair of the Structural Chemistry Commission of the International Union of Crystallography, and was elected to its executive committee in 2023. She calso chairs the board of the Cambridge Crystallographic Data Centre, and has served as an editor of the CrystEngComm journal.

=== Awards ===
In 2019, she was awarded the Distinguished Women in Chemistry or Chemical Engineering award from the International Union of Pure and Applied Chemistry (IUPAC).
