= Oana Jurchescu =

Physicist

Oana Diana Jurchescu
- Education: University of Groningen; West University of Timișoara
- Scientific career
- Workplaces: Wake Forest University
- Thesis: Molecular organic semiconductors for electronic devices (2006)

Oana Jurchescu is a Romanian physicist who is the Baker Family Physics Professor at Wake Forest University. Her research considers charge transport in organic and organic/inorganic hybrid semiconductors. In 2022, she was awarded a National Science Foundation Special Creativity Award for her work translating organic electronic materials into real-world devices.

== Early life and education ==
Jurchescu was an undergraduate student at the West University of Timișoara in Romania. She moved to the University of Groningen in the Netherlands for her doctoral research, where she studied organic semiconductors for optoelectronic devices. She was a postdoctoral researcher at the National Institute of Standards and Technology.

== Research and career ==
In 2009, Jurchescu joined the Department of Physics at Wake Forest University. Her work considers novel functional materials and their application in electronic devices. She has particularly explored organic and hybrid organic-inorganic semiconductors and how they can realize large-area, flexible electronic devices.

Jurchescu worked with physicians to realize organic field-effect transistor- based radiation detectors for patients undergoing cancer treatment. These devices, based on 2,8-difluoro-5,11-bis(triethylsilylethynyl)anthradithiophene (diF-TES ADT), acted as in vivo dosimeters to monitor radiation levels on a patient's skin in real time. As well as pursuing high charge carrier mobilities, Jurchescu is interested in the degradation pathways that can impede the performance and lifetime of organic electronic devices.

Jurcheschu was named Baker Family Professor of Physics in 2021. In 2022, she was awarded an NSF Special Creativity Award to develop OSCAR, Organic Semiconductors by Computation on the Accelerated Refinement. OSCAR look to develop novel functional molecular materials to accelerate commercialization.

== Awards and honors ==
- 2012 Wake Forest University Faculty Endowment Fund Fellowship
- 2013 Wake Forest University Reid-Doyle Prize for Excellence in Teaching
- 2013 National Science Foundation CAREER Award
- 2013 Wake Forest University Innovation Award
- 2014 Journal of Materials Chemistry C Emerging Investigators Issue
- 2015 Wake Forest University Award for Excellence in Research
- 2017 Kulynych Family Omicron Delta Kappa Award
- 2018 URECA Award For Excellence in Mentorship in Research and Creative Work
- 2020 Graduate School Student Association Faculty Excellence Award
- 2024 Fellow of the American Physical Society

== Selected publications ==
- Jurchescu, Oana D.; Baas, Jacob; Palstra, Thomas T. M. (2004-04-19). "Effect of impurities on the mobility of single crystal pentacene". Applied Physics Letters. 84 (16): 3061–3063. arXiv:cond-mat/0404130. Bibcode:2004ApPhL..84.3061J. doi:10.1063/1.1704874. ISSN 0003-6951. S2CID 118849296.
- D J Gundlach; J E Royer; S K Park; et al. (2008). "Contact-induced crystallinity for high-performance soluble acene-based transistors and circuits". Nature Materials. 7 (3): 216–221. doi:10.1038/nmat2122. PMID 18278050. Wikidata Q47910287.
- Emily G Bittle; James I Basham; Thomas N Jackson; Oana D Jurchescu; David J Gundlach (2016). "Mobility overestimation due to gated contacts in organic field-effect transistors". Nature Communications. 7 10908. Bibcode:2016NatCo...710908B. doi:10.1038/ncomms10908. PMC 4792947. PMID 26961271. Wikidata Q36690168.
- Oana D Jurchescu; Auke Meetsma; Thomas T M Palstra (2006). "Low-temperature structure of rubrene single crystals grown by vapor transport". Acta Crystallographica Section B: Structural Science. 62 (Pt 2): 330–334. doi:10.1107/s0108768106003053. PMID 16552167. Wikidata Q82904721.
