= Peter Skabara =

British chemist (born 1968)

- Born: 1968 (age 57–58)
- Education: Durham University (PhD, 1994) Queen Mary and Westfield College (1991)
- Scientific career
- Workplaces: University of Strathclyde University of Glasgow
- Thesis: Functionalised tetrathiafulvalenes in supramolecular chemistry (1994)
- Doctoral advisor: Martin Bryce

Peter John Skabara (born 1968) is a British chemist at the University of Glasgow, where he holds the Ramsay Chair in Chemistry.

Skabara earned a first-class honours degree in chemistry from Queen Mary and Westfield College in 1991, and completed his PhD at Durham University in 1994.

From 2005 to 2017, he held the James Young Chair of Chemistry and served as Head of Department at the University of Strathclyde. He was Editor-in-Chief of Journal of Materials Chemistry C from 2011 to 2019. He received a Royal Society Wolfson Research Merit Award in 2014.
