= NPR (disambiguation) =

NPR, officially National Public Radio, is a media organization that serves as a national syndicator to most public radio stations in the US.

NPR may also refer to:

== Arts, entertainment and media ==
- National Philharmonic of Russia, a Russian orchestra
- Natural Product Reports, a British peer-reviewed scientific journal published by the Royal Society of Chemistry
- Natural Product Radiance, an Indian scientific journal
- Nevada Public Radio, a public corporation operating several radio stations in Nevada

== Government ==
- National Partnership for Reinventing Government (originally the National Performance Review), an interagency task force, an effort to reform the way the US federal government works
- Nuclear Posture Review, the periodic assessment carried out by the US Department of Defense
- National Population Register, a database of residents in India with Unique Identification Authority of India numbers
- National Police Reserve, a lightly armed national police force during the Allied occupation of Japan and a predecessor to the Japan Ground Self-Defense Force (JGSDF)

== Rail transportation ==
- Nippori Station, JR East station code
- North Pennsylvania Railroad, a former railroad company that served areas around Philadelphia
- Northern Pacific Railway, former railroad from Wisconsin to Washington State
- Northern Plains Railroad, a short-line railroad that operates in Minnesota and North Dakota
- Northern Powerhouse Rail, a proposed railway in northern England

== Technology ==
- Non-photorealistic rendering, a computer-graphics-rendering technique that does not aim toward photorealism
- _{n}P_{r}, a function for computing permutations in some calculators

== Other uses ==
- Nepalese rupee, by ISO 4217 currency code
- Isuzu Elf, known as the Isuzu NPR in North America

== See also ==
- National Petroleum Reserve–Alaska (NPRA), an area of land on the Alaska North Slope owned by the US federal government
- Notice of proposed rulemaking (NPRM), a public notice issued by a federal agency when it wishes to add, remove, or modify a regulation
