= Joanne Etheridge =

Australian physicist

Joanne Etheridge FAA
- Education: University of Melbourne; RMIT University
- Awards: K. M. Stott Prize; John Sanders Medal; AAS Lloyd Rees Lecture
- Scientific career
- Fields: Electron microscopy Imaging and diffraction physics Materials science
- Workplaces: University of Cambridge; McMaster University; Monash University
- Thesis: Nanodomain structure in Ba2HoCu3O7 (1993)

Joanne Etheridge FAA is an Australian physicist. She is Director of the Monash Centre for Electron Microscopy and Professor in the Department of Materials Science and Engineering at Monash University.

== Academic career ==
Etheridge graduated with a BSc from the University of Melbourne and a PhD in physics from RMIT University in 1993. In 1994 she moved to the University of Cambridge as Rosalind Franklin Research Fellow, Newnham College and in 1997 became a senior research associate in the Department of Materials Science and Metallurgy there. From 1999 to 2003 she was Royal Society University Research Fellow in the same department. From 2005 to 2008 she was also a visiting professor at the Brockhouse Institute at McMaster University.

She returned to Monash University in Melbourne to set up and lead the Monash Centre for Electron Microscopy, where she has pioneered electron diffraction and microscopy techniques and ultra-high resolution electron microscopy in Australia. As of 2021 she is on the Editorial Board of the international journal, Ultramicroscopy.

== Awards and recognition ==
Etheridge won the University of Cambridge's K. M. Stott Prize in 1995 and the John Sanders Medal awarded by the Australian Microscopy and Microanalysis Society in 2016. In 2012 she presented the Lloyd Rees Lecture of the Australian Academy of Science.

In 2019 she was elected Fellow of the Australian Academy of Science.

In 2022 she was named the Australian Research Council Georgina Sweet Australian Laureate Fellow.

In 2024, she was awarded the Australian Institute of Physics' Walter Boas Medal for Excellence in Research, for her "development of electron scattering methods to determine the structure of condensed matter at the atomic scale and the application of these methods to understand structure–property relationships in functional materials".

== Selected works ==
- Etheridge, Joanne (1996). "Structural perturbations at intervals of the coherence length in YBa2Cu3O7−δ(δ < 0.1)". Philosophical Magazine A: Physics of Condensed Matter, Structure, Defects and Mechanical Properties. 73 (3): 643–668. doi:10.1080/01418619608242988. Wikidata Q106814048.
- Etheridge, Joanne (1999). "High-resolution electron-microscope images of crystals with correlated atomic displacements". Acta Crystallographica Section A. 55 (Pt 2 Pt 1): 143–159. doi:10.1107/s0108767398008617. PMID 10927244. Wikidata Q74115281.
- Dwyer C; Etheridge, Joanne (2003). "Scattering of A-scale electron probes in silicon". Ultramicroscopy. 96 (3–4): 343–360. doi:10.1016/s0304-3991(03)00100-1. PMID 12871800. Wikidata Q31150149.
- Maunders, Christian; C Dwyer; Tiemeijer, Peter Christiaan; Etheridge, Joanne (2011). "Practical methods for the measurement of spatial coherence--a comparative study". Ultramicroscopy. 111 (8): 1437–1446. doi:10.1016/j.ultramic.2011.05.011. PMID 21864787. Wikidata Q34002017.
- Etheridge, Joanne; Sorin Lazar; Christian Dwyer; Botton, Gianluigi (2011). "Imaging high-energy electrons propagating in a crystal". Physical Review Letters. 106 (16) 160802. doi:10.1103/physrevlett.106.160802. PMID 21599348. Wikidata Q63790169.
