= Francesca M. Kerton =

Canadian chemist

- Education: University of Sussex, University of Kent
- Scientific career
- Fields: green chemistry
- Workplaces: Memorial University of Newfoundland
- Thesis: Organometallic based transition metal catalysts. (1998)
- Doctoral advisor: Gerard A. Lawless
- Website: https://greenchem.wordpress.com/

Francesca M. Kerton is a green chemist and Professor of Chemistry at Memorial University of Newfoundland, Canada.

== Early life ==
Kerton completed her B.Sc. (Hons) in chemistry with environmental science at the University of Kent. She then completed her D.Phil. (1995–1999) at the University of Sussex.

== Academic career ==
Following a postdoctoral fellowship at the University of British Columbia (1999–2000), Kerton was appointed as a junior lecturer at the University of York (2000–2002). She was awarded a Royal Society (UK) University Research Fellowship (2002–2004). She was appointed as an assistant professor in the Department of Chemistry at the Memorial University of Newfoundland in 2005, where she founded the Green Chemistry and Catalysis Group. She was promoted to associate professor in 2010 and promoted to professor in 2015.

== Research ==
Kerton has authored more than 80 scientific papers related to green chemistry, organometallic chemistry, catalysis, and polymer chemistry. Kerton and her research group have contributed to the development of processes to convert waste from fish and shellfish processing plants into chemical feedstocks. Her laboratory has also developed polymerization catalysts using earth-abundant metals.

== Published work ==
Kerton is the co-author of the book Alternative Solvents for Green Chemistry, which is published by the Royal Society for Chemistry. She has also authored Fuels, Chemicals and Materials from the Oceans and Aquatic Sources, which is published by Wiley.

== Honours and awards ==
Kerton was selected as one of three Canadian Women for the 25 Women in Science 2024 cohort whose research focuses on environmental sustainability. This recognition aims to increase the visibility of women researchers and highlights Kerton's research targeting new environmentally-friendly technologies to transform food waste towards achieving a circular economy. In 2023, Kerton was the recipient of the Kalev Pugi Award from the Society of Chemical Industry (SCI) Canada Group. Kerton received the 2016 Dean's Distinguished Scholar Medal at Memorial University. In 2019, Kerton was recognized for her research with the Canadian Green Chemistry and Engineering Award (Individual). She was made a Fellow of the Royal Society of Chemistry in 2016.

== Other contributions ==
Kerton has served on the interdisciplinary adjudication committee for Canada Research Chairs program and as an evaluator of Fellowship proposals for the Association of Commonwealth Universities Blue Charter. She is an associate editor of the journal RSC Sustainability and a member of the editorial advisory board for the journal Reaction Chemistry and Engineering both published by the Royal Society of Chemistry. She is a member of the IUPAC committee for Chemistry Research Applied to World Needs (CHEMRAWN) and chair of this committee since January 2020. She was the co-chair for the 27th Annual Green Chemistry and Engineering Conference in 2023, and will serve as Conference Chair for the 2027 IUPAC | CSC 51st World Chemistry Congress and 54th General Assembly.
