= Elizabeth New =

Australian chemist

Professor Elizabeth New AM FRACI FRSN FRSC
- Born: Elizabeth Joy New; 1984 (age 41–42)
- Education: University of Sydney; Durham University
- Awards: Eureka Prize, 2018
- Scientific career
- Workplaces: University of California, Berkeley; University of Sydney
- Thesis: Understanding the cellular behaviour of the luminescent lanthanide complexes (2009)
- Doctoral advisor: David Parker
- Website: sydney.edu.au/science/people/elizabeth.new.php

Elizabeth Joy New (born 1984) is an Australian chemist and Professor of the School of Chemistry, University of Sydney. She won the 2018 Australian Museum 3M Eureka Prize.

== Early life and education ==
New was born in Sydney in 1984. She represented Australia at the International Chemistry Olympiad in 2000 and 2001, winning bronze and gold medals respectively, and graduated from James Ruse Agricultural High School with a UAI of 100. She earned a bachelor's degree in chemistry at the University of Sydney in 2005, where she completed her master's degree in 2006 with Professor Trevor Hambley. During her graduate studies she worked on fluorescent tags to monitor the cellular uptake and metabolism of anti-tumor complexes. New completed her doctoral studies at Durham University working with David Parker, graduating in 2010. Her work looked at the cellular behaviour of lanthanide complexes.

== Research and career ==
She was appointed a Royal Commission for the Exhibition of 1851 Research Fellow at the University of California, Berkeley in 2010. She worked with Christopher Chang on fluorescent sensors for copper. She was an Australian Research Council Discovery Early Career Research Fellow from 2012-2014, and held a Westpac Research Fellowship from 2016-2019. New's group developed reversible fluorescent sensors for cellular redox environments. She provided the first examples of reversible ratiometric cytoplasmic sensing and mitochondrial sensing. Her group has developed cobalt complexes for contrast agents in magnetic resonance imaging. The complexes can be used to monitor oxidative stress. They have also worked on the development of fluorescent sensor arrays for biological and analytical applications.

New was made a lecturer in 2015 and a senior lecturer in 2016. In 2017 she received the ChemComm Emerging Investigator. She was appointed Associate Professor in 2018 and Professor in 2021.

=== Awards ===
- 2024 Medal of the Order of Australia (OAM)
- 2023 Society for Biological Inorganic Chemistry Early Career Award
- 2022 Australian Financial Review Emerging Leader in Higher Education
- 2020 Chemosensors Young Investigator Award
- 2019 Malcolm McIntosh Prize for Physical Scientist of the Year
- 2018 Royal Society of New South Wales Edgeworth David Medal
- 2018 3M Eureka Prize for Emerging Leader in Science
- 2018 Fellow of the Royal Society of New South Wales
- 2017 Royal Australian Chemical Institute Rennie Memorial Medal
- 2017 Royal Australian Chemical Institute Educator of the Year Award
- 2016 New South Wales Early Career Researcher of the Year
- 2015 Office of Learning and Teaching Teaching Excellence Award
- 2015 Young Tall Poppy Science Award
- 2015 Selby Research Award
- 2015 Vice-Chancellor award for Outstanding Teaching
- 2014 Royal Australian Chemical Institute Nyholm Lectureship, 2014-2015
- 2014 Asian Biological Inorganic Chemistry Early Career Research Award
- 2011 Royal Society of Chemistry Dalton Young Researchers Award
- 2005 University of Sydney The University Medal
