= Alfred Crosby =

Alfred Crosby may refer to:

- Alfred W. Crosby (1931–2018), professor of history, geography, and American studies
- Alfred J. Crosby, American materials scientist
