= NPU =

NPU or npu may refer to:

== Science and technology ==
- Net protein utilization, the percentage of ingested nitrogen retained in the body
- NPU terminology (Nomenclature for Properties and Units), for the clinical laboratory sciences

=== Computing ===
- Network processing unit, hardware for networking
- Neural processing unit, hardware for artificial intelligence
- Numeric processing unit, or floating-point unit, hardware for floating-point numbers

== Organisations ==
- Na Píobairí Uilleann, an organisation promoting Uilleann pipes and its music
- Neighborhood planning unit, in Atlanta, Georgia, United States
- Nineveh Plain Protection Units, an Assyrian regional militia in Iraq
- National Police of Ukraine, a government agency
- National Power Unity, a Latvian political party

=== Universities ===
- Nilamber-Pitamber University, India
- National Penghu University of Science and Technology, Taiwan
- Northwestern Polytechnical University, China
- Northwestern Polytechnic University, the former name of San Francisco Bay University, California, United States
- North Park University, Chicago, Illinois, United States

== Other uses ==
- Natural Product Updates, an academic journal
- Puimei Naga language, an ISO 639-3 code
