= Natalie Stingelin =

Materials scientist

Natalie Stingelin FMRS FRSC
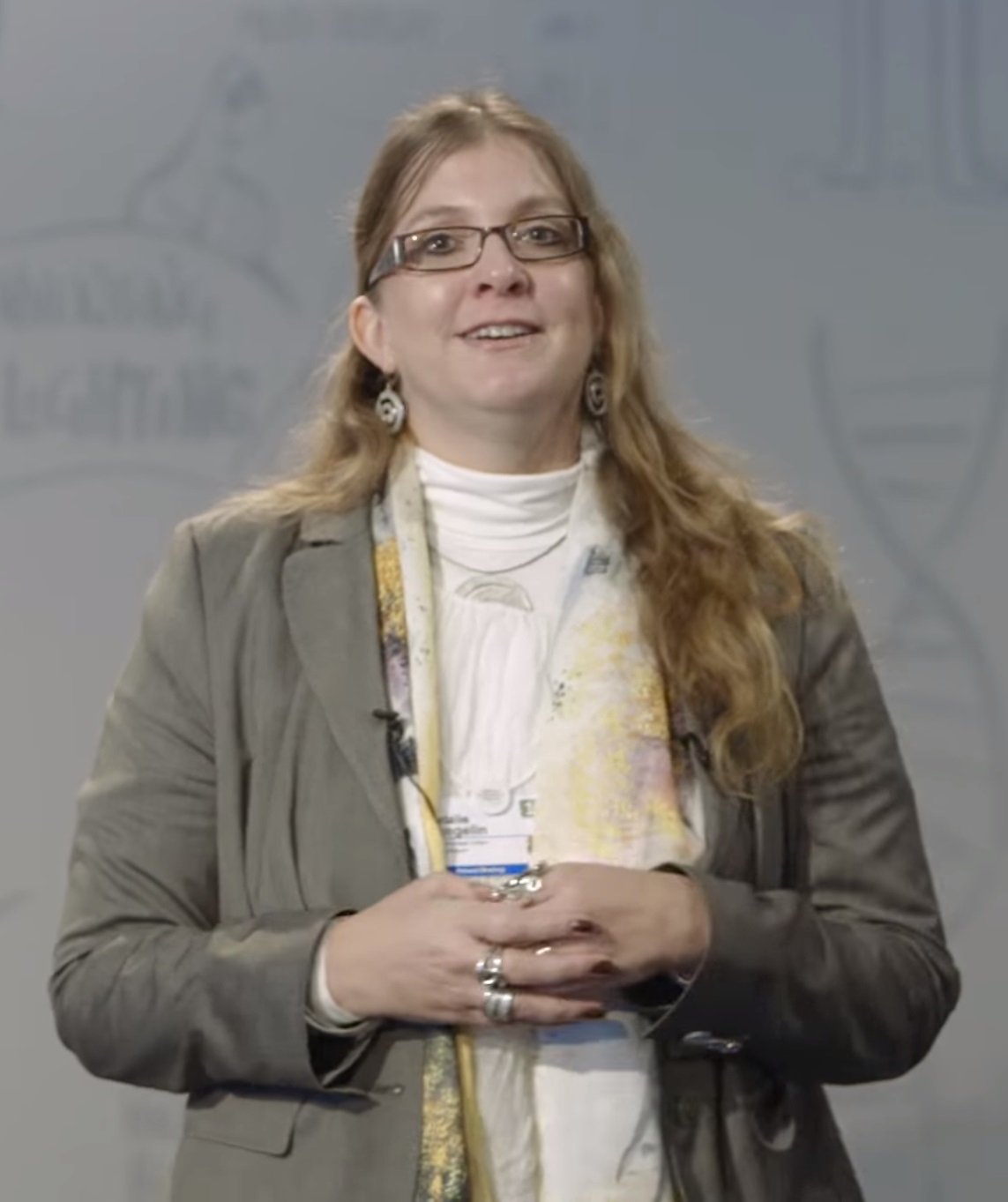
- Natalie Stingelin speaks on plastics at the World Economic Forum in 2016
- Born: Natalie Stingelin; 1973 (age 52–53)
- Education: ETH Zurich (PhD)
- Awards: Fellow of the National Academy of Inventors (2021); Suffrage Science award (2021); IOM3 Rosenhain Medal (2014)
- Scientific career
- Fields: Plastic electronics Photonics; Bioelectronics
- Workplaces: University of Bordeaux; Georgia Institute of Technology; Imperial College London; Philips Research Laboratories; University of Cambridge; Queen Mary University of London; ETH Zurich
- Thesis: Microstructuring of polymers and polymer-supported matter processes and applications (2001)
- Doctoral advisor: Paul Smith
- Website: stingelin-lab.gatech.edu#about lcpo.fr/non-permanent/natalie-stingelin/ imperial.ac.uk/people/n.stingelin-stutzmann

Natalie Stingelin (also published under Natalie Stutzmann and Natalie Stingelin-Stutzmann), Fellow of the Materials Research Society and Royal Society of Chemistry (FRSC), is a materials scientist and current chair of the School of Materials Science and Engineering at the Georgia Institute of Technology (since 2016; chair since 2022), the University of Bordeaux (since 2017) and Imperial College (since 2009). She led the European Commission Marie Curie INFORM network and is Editor-in-Chief of the Journal of Materials Chemistry C and Materials Advances.

== Early life and education ==
Stingelin originally wanted to study architecture but instead decided to study materials science at ETH Zurich, graduating in 1997. She remained there for her graduate studies, earning a PhD in 2001 which was awarded the ETH Zurich medal – the highest honour a PhD can receive at ETH Zurich.

== Research and career ==
She joined the Philips Research Laboratories as a research associate in 2003. She was a research associate at the University of Cambridge and Queen Mary University of London. At Cambridge she worked with Henning Sirringhaus and Sir Richard Friend.

Stingelin secured funding from the EPSRC to establish the Centre for Plastic Electronics at Imperial College London. She studies organic electronic materials and how their microstructure impacts their electronic properties. She is a member of the IUPAC committee on polymer terminology. In 2011, Stingelin was awarded a European Research Council starting grant, and in 2015, she secured an ERC Proof-of-Concept grant. Her research considers organic photovoltaics and organic thin film transistors. Her main research areas are the microfabrication and selective patterning of organic electronic materials and inorganic-organic frameworks. She developed a model that describes the relationship between charge transport, disorder and aggregation in conjugated molecular systems. High molecular weight polymers demonstrate a charge transport that is limited by lattice disorder. She also demonstrated that crystallisation of fullerene molecules in polymer/fullerene blends is the driver of charge separation.

Stingelin has been the co-lead of the Engineering and Physical Sciences Research Council Centre for Innovative Manufacturing in Large Area Electronics, and led the European Commission Marie Curie INFORM network. In 2016, Stingelin joined Georgia Institute of Technology, and since 2017, she has been active in Bordeaux as Chaire Internationale Associée, enabled by the Excellence Initiative of the Université de Bordeaux. On August 1, 2022 she began her post as the chair of the School of Materials Science and Engineering at Georgia Tech after working with both the schools of Material Science and Engineering as well as Chemical & Biomolecular Engineering. She has spoken about organic electronic materials at the World Economic Forum. She is on the editorial board of the Journal of Materials Chemistry C, Advanced Functional Materials, ACS Macro Letters, ACS Materials Letters, Chemistry of Materials, Materials Advances, Polymer Chemistry and Polymer Crystallization.

=== Awards and honours ===
Stingelin's awards and honours include:

- 2011: ERC Starting Independent Researcher Grant
- 2012: Elected a Fellow of the Royal Society of Chemistry (FRSC).
- 2014: Institute of Materials, Minerals and Mining Rosenhain Medal and Prize
- 2015: Chinese Academy of Sciences President's International Fellowship Initiative
- 2015: ERC Proof-of-Concept Grant
- 2016: Chair of the Gordon Research Conference on Electronic Processes in Organic Materials
- 2019: Elected a Fellow of the Materials Research Society
- 2021: Engineering and Physical Sciences Suffrage Science award
- 2021: Fellow of the National Academy of Inventors
- 2025: Fellow of the American Physical Society
