= Danielle Benoit =

Bioengineering researcher

- Born: Danielle S. W. Benoit
- Education: University of Colorado Boulder (PhD, MS); University of Maine (BS)
- Known for: Research in biomaterials, drug delivery, and regenerative medicine
- Awards: National Science Foundation CAREER Award; Fellow of the National Academy of Inventors; Fellow of the Biomedical Engineering Society
- Scientific career
- Fields: Bioengineering, biomaterials, tissue engineering
- Workplaces: University of Oregon; University of Rochester

Danielle S.W. Benoit is an American bioengineer and academic administrator. She is the Inaugural Chair of the Department of Bioengineering and the Lorry Lokey Chair at the University of Oregon's Knight Campus for Accelerating Scientific Impact. Her research focuses on the design of biomaterials for controlled drug delivery and regenerative medicine, specifically targeting bone tissue engineering and dental applications.

== Education ==
Benoit earned a B.S. in biological engineering from the University of Maine in 2002. She received an M.S. in chemical engineering in 2005 and a Ph.D. in chemical engineering in 2006 from the University of Colorado Boulder.

== Career ==
Benoit joined the University of Rochester in 2010 as a faculty member in biomedical engineering. Her appointments there included positions in biomedical engineering, chemical engineering, orthopaedics, the Center for Musculoskeletal Research, biomedical genetics, and the Center for Oral Biology. She later became William R. Kenan, Jr. Professor of Biomedical Engineering and director of the university's Materials Science Program.

In 2022, Benoit joined the University of Oregon as the inaugural chair of the Department of Bioengineering at the Knight Campus for Accelerating Scientific Impact. She was also appointed Lorry Lokey Chair and professor of bioengineering. In the same year, she was named a visiting professor at the University of Rochester.

In 2025, she received the University of Oregon Office of the Provost Outstanding Department Head Award.

== Research ==
Benoit's research is centered on therapeutic biomaterials: engineered materials designed to interact with cells, tissues, and biological environments for applications in drug delivery and regenerative medicine. Her work has emphasized polymeric systems, including hydrogels and nanoparticles, that can deliver therapeutic agents locally, respond to biological conditions, or guide cell behavior.

A major area of Benoit's research concerns biomaterials for bone regeneration and bone-targeted drug delivery. Her group has studied tissue engineering strategies for bone allograft repair, including engineered periosteum approaches and hydrogels designed to support vascularization, mineralization, and integration of grafts. Her NSF CAREER Award project focused on polymer therapeutics for bone regeneration and on targeted drug-delivery systems for osteoporosis. Later work from her group examined bone-targeted nanoparticle systems for modulating macrophage behavior during fracture healing.

Another focus of her work is the development of responsive and targeted nanoparticle systems. Benoit's laboratory has studied pH-responsive nanoparticles for delivery of nucleic acids and small molecules, as well as surface-modified nanoparticles intended to alter protein adsorption and immune interactions in vivo.

Benoit has also contributed to biomaterials research for tendon healing. In 2024, Benoit and collaborators reported a nanoparticle-based tendon-targeting drug-delivery system designed to pharmacologically modulate tendon healing. Related work has examined anisotropic hydrogel systems intended to mimic aspects of the native tendon environment.

Her research has further included salivary gland regeneration, tissue-chip systems, oral biofilm treatments, and microphysiological disease models. Benoit and collaborators have used salivary gland tissue-chip platforms for screening candidate radioprotective drugs. Her group has also worked on nanoparticle-based approaches to oral biofilm treatments and anti-caries therapies.

== Awards and honors ==
- National Science Foundation CAREER Award (2015–2020)
- Emerging Investigators, Journal of Materials Chemistry B (2016)
- Kate Gleason Rochester Young Engineer of the Year, Rochester Engineering Society (2017)
- Outstanding Reviewer Award, Acta Biomaterialia (2018)
- Francis Crowe Distinguished Engineering Alumni Award, University of Maine (2018)
- College Award for Undergraduate Teaching and Research Mentorship, University of Rochester (2019)
- College of Fellows, American Institute for Medical and Biological Engineering (AIMBE) (2019)
- Fellow, Biomedical Engineering Society (Class of 2023)
- Fellow, National Academy of Inventors (Class of 2023)
- Office of the Provost Outstanding Department Head Award, University of Oregon (2025)
- Acta Biomaterialia Silver Medal, Acta Materialia (2026)
