= Photochemical action plots =

Photochemical technique

Photochemical action plots are a scientific tool used to understand the effects of different wavelengths of light on photochemical reactions. The methodology involves exposing a reaction solution to the same number of photons at varying monochromatic wavelengths, monitoring the conversion or reaction yield of starting materials and/or reaction products. Such global high-resolution analysis of wavelength-dependent chemical reactivity has revealed that maxima in absorbance and reactivity often do not align. Photochemical action plots are historically connected to (biological) action spectra.

== Historical development ==
The study of biological responses to specific wavelengths dates back to the late 19th century. Research primarily focused on assessing photodamage from solar radiation using broad-band lamps and narrow filters. These studies quantified effects such as cell viability, production of erythema, vitamin D3 degradation, DNA changes, and skin cancer appearance. The first biological action spectrum was recorded by Engelmann, who used a prism to produce different colors of light and then illuminated cladophora in a bacteria suspension. He discovered the effects of different light wavelengths on photosynthesis, marking the first recorded action spectrum of photosynthesis.

Critical evaluations of active wavelength regions in these studies helped identify contributing chromophores to processes such as photosynthesis. These chromophores are key for converting solar energy into chemical energy, with their absorption closely matching the rate of photosynthesis, usually determined by oxygen production or carbon fixation. This correlation led to the discovery of chlorophyll as a key chromophore in plant growth. Such studies have also been instrumental in identifying DNA as the core genetic material, key wavelengths leading to skin cancer, the transparent optical window of biological tissue, and the influence of color on circadian rhythms.

In the late 20th century, action spectra became essential in developing optical devices for photocatalysis and photovoltaics, particularly in measuring photocurrent efficiency at various wavelengths. These studies have been vital in understanding primary contributors to photocurrent generation, leading to advancements in materials, morphologies, and device designs for improved solar energy capture and utilization.

In photochemistry, action spectra have been mainly used in photodissociation studies. These involve a monochromatic light source, often a laser, coupled with a mass spectrometer to record wavelength-dependent ion dissociation in gaseous phases. These spectra help identify contributing chromophores in molecular systems, characterize radical generation and unstable isomers, and understand higher state electron dynamics.

The field underwent a transformation when a team led by Barner-Kowollik and Gescheidt recorded the first modern-day photochemical action plot using a tuneable monochromatic nanosecond pulsed laser system, discovering a strong mismatch between photochemical reactivity and absorptivity and marking a critical advancement in mapping wavelength-dependent conversions in photoinduced polymerizations. Following this, numerous photochemical action plots have been recorded in various molecular and polymerization systems.

== Experimental setup ==
Key differences between traditional (biological) action spectra and modern photochemical action plots lie in the precision resolution of wavelengths (monochromaticity) and that an exact number of photons at each wavelength is applied coupled with the fact that covalent bond forming reactions were investigated for the first time.

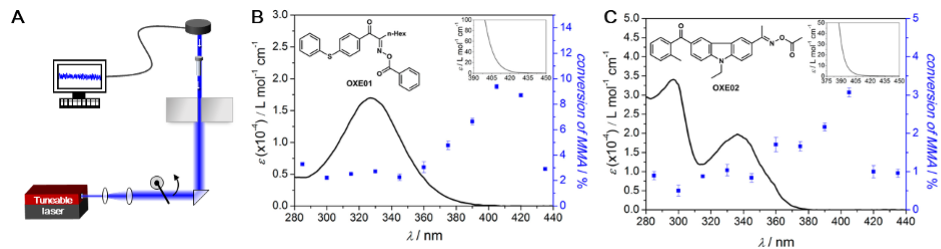
A) Experimental setup featuring an adjustable, monochromatic light source shining from below into a clear vial with the reactive mixture, ensuring consistent photon delivery at each targeted wavelength. B,C) Two examples of action plots of two different photo initiators displaying their absorbance (blue line) and experimentally determined monomer conversion.

In the field of photochemical analysis, it is common to measure the extinction of chemicals with high precision, often at the sub-nanometer scale, using UV/Vis spectroscopy. To understand fundamental relationships between a chemical's absorbance and its photoreactivity, a detailed analysis of the reactivity at a similar level of resolution is required. Traditional methods using broadly emitting light sources or filters have inherent limitations in resolving true wavelength dependence in photoreactivity. To record an action plot, a wavelength-tuneable laser system is employed, capable of delivering a stable number of photons at each wavelength. The photoreactive reaction mixture is divided into aliquots and subjected to monochromatic light independently. The photochemical process' yield or conversion is subsequently measured using sensors like UV-Vis absorption or nuclear magnetic resonance (NMR) frequency changes.

== Findings and implications ==
A key finding of modern photochemical action plots is that the absorption spectrum of a photoreactive molecule or reaction mixture correlates poorly with photochemical reactivity as a function of wavelength in many cases. Initial studies showed a significant red-shift in photopolymerization yield compared to the absorption spectrum of the employed photoinitiators, which showed extremely low absorptivity in those regions. This mismatch between absorption spectra and photochemical action plots has by now been observed in a wide array of photoreactive systems. A prominent example is the photoinduced [2+2] cycloaddition of the stilbene derivative, styrypyrene, which exhibited an 80 nm discrepancy between the action plot and absorption spectrum. Current research focuses on understanding the reasons behind these frequently observed mismatches, with a recent theory positing that local microenvironments around the chromophore generate a distribution of molecules with access to longer lived and lower energetic excited states that are accessible at longer wavelength. For photochemical applications, the consequences of the absorptivity/reactivity mismatch are far reaching, as only photochemical action plots can reveal the most effective wavelength for a given process, moving away from the past paradigm that absorption spectra provide guidance for selecting the most effective wavelength.
