= Rennie Memorial Medal =

Australian science and technology award

The Rennie Memorial Medal is an Australian National Award that is awarded annually to a financial member of the Royal Australian Chemical Institute with less than 8 years of professional experience since completing their most recent relevant qualification of a BSc, BSc (Hons), MSc or PhD, or the equivalent, "for the person who has contributed most towards the development of some branch of chemical science".

The contribution is judged by the research work published during the ten (10) years immediately preceding the award.

Named after Edward Rennie, the medal was first awarded in 1931 to R. J. Best. The medal is awarded annually, although no awards were made in the years 1938, 1939, 1962, 1980. The medal has on occasion been awarded to two recipients.

== List of recipients ==
Source: Royal Australian Chemical Institute

Year	Recipient
1931	Rupert J. Best (d)
1932	J. W. H. Lugg (d)
1933	F. Penman (d)
1934	J. E. Mills (d)
1935	W. J. Wiley (d)
1936	Adolph Bolliger (d)
1937	R. S. Russell (d)
1938	No award
1939	No award
1940	F. P. J. Dwyer (d)
1941	Francis G. Lennox (d)
1942	W. A. Rawlinson (d)
1943	Keith L. Sutherland (d)
1944	D. T. C. Gillespie
1945	Albert Lloyd George Rees (d)
1946	Robert H. Stokes
1947	J. A. Mills (d)
1948	M. F. R. Mulcahy
1949	John B. Willis
1950	Donald E. Weiss
1951	Ronald D. Brown
1952	A. S. Buchanan
1953	J. D. Morrison
1954	A. J. Hodge (d)
1955	Donald R. Stranks (d)
1956	P. R. Jefferies
1957	J. H. Bradbury
1958	Amyand D. Buckingham
1959	Athelstan L. J. Beckwith (d)
1960	M. L. Heffernan (d)
1961	Ian G. McWilliam
1962	No award
1963	Alan J. Parker (d)
1964	T. Mole
1965	P. T. McTigue
1966	Donald W. Watts
1967	John H. Bowie
1968	Thomas W. Healy
1969	W. K. Kitching
1970	David St. C. Black
1971	John A. Elix / Thomas H. Spurling
1972	Kenneth N. Marsh / M. V. Sargent
1973	Frank P. Larkins
1974	David M. Doddrell
1975	Alan M. Bond
1976	P. J. Derrick
1977	Leo Radom
1978	W. G. Jackson
1979	A. E. W. Knight / F. Richard Keene
1980	No award
1981	Geoffrey A. Lawrance
1982	Denis J. Evans
1983	L. Field
1984	Michael A. Collins
1985	P. M. Pashley
1986	Martin Banwell
1987	P. A. Lay
1988	Anthony D. J. Haymet
1989	D. MacFarlane
1990	Calum J. Drummond / Mark G. Moloney
1991	David J. Young
1992	Craig J. Hawker / J. M. White
1993	Margaret M. Harding / C. H. Schiesser
1994	S. C. Smith
1995	Ian A. Maxwell
1996	G. T. Russell
1997	M. A. Rizzacasa
1998	William S. Price
1999	M. A. Buntine
2000	Frank Caruso
2001	D. K. Taylor
2002	Stuart R. Batten
2003	Cameron J. Kepert
2004	Christopher Barner-Kowollik
2005	Malcolm Macleod
2006	Michelle Coote
2007	Stephen Blanksby
2008	Spencer J. Williams
2009	Sébastien Perrier
2010	Paul S. Donnelly
2011	Richard J. Payne
2012	Keith A. Stubbs
2013	David W. Lupton
2014	Deanna D'Alessandro
2015	Colin Jackson
2016	Ravichandar Babarao
2017	Elizabeth New
2018	Neeraj Sharma
2019	Debbie Silvester
2020	Lars Goerigk / Nicholas White
2021	Markus Muellner
2022	Lara Malins
2023	Lauren Macreadie / Christopher Nitsche
2024	Wenyi Li
2025	Dan Preston

== See also ==
- List of chemistry awards
