= Materials Horizons =

Scientific journal

- Discipline: Materials Science
- Language: English
- Edited by: Martina Stenzel

Publication details
- History: 2014–present
- Publisher: Royal Society of Chemistry (United Kingdom)
- Frequency: Bimonthly
- Impact factor: 15.717 (2021)

Standard abbreviations
- ISO 4: Mater. Horiz.

Indexing
- CODEN: MHAOBM
- ISSN: 2051-6347 (print); 2051-6355 (web)
- OCLC no.: 869908360

Links
- Journal homepage

Materials Horizons is a bimonthly peer-reviewed scientific journal that covers research across the breadth of materials science at the interface between chemistry, physics, biology and engineering. The current editor-in-chief is Martina Stenzel. The journal was established in 2014. A sister journal Nanoscale Horizons was launched in 2016.

== Article types ==
The journal publishes "communications" (articles for rapid publication), "reviews" (state-of-the-art accounts of a research field), "mini-reviews" (research highlights in an emerging area of materials science, usually from the past 2–3 years) and "focus articles" (educational articles providing an overview of a concept in materials science).

== Abstracting and indexing ==
The journal is indexed in the Science Citation Index. Selective content is also indexed in Polymer Library, Inspec, Biotechnology and Bioengineering Abstracts, METADEX, Mechanical Engineering Abstracts, Solid State and Superconductivity Abstracts, Metal Abstracts and CSA Technology Research Database, and CABI.

== See also ==
- List of scientific journals in chemistry
- Journal of Materials Chemistry A
- Journal of Materials Chemistry B
- Journal of Materials Chemistry C
