= Olaplex =

Hair care brand

Olaplex Holdings, Inc.
- Type: Public
- Traded as: Nasdaq: OLPX; Russell 2000 component
- Industry: Professional hair care
- Founded: 2014; 12 years ago
- Founder: Dean Christal
- Headquarters: Santa Barbara, California, U.S.
- Key people: John Bilbrey (Interim CEO); Eric Tiziani (Chief Financial Officer); John Duffy (General Counsel); Trisha Fox (Chief People Officer); John Keppeler (Chief Revenue Officer); Charlotte Watson (Chief Marketing Officer)
- Owner: Advent International
- Website: olaplex.com

Olaplex is a hair care brand founded in 2014 by Dean Christal. The product was developed by two chemists, Eric Presley and Craig Hawker, and is advertised to rebuild broken bonds in hair caused by chemical, thermal, and mechanical damage.

== History ==
Olaplex was founded in 2014 by Dean Christal. In 2019, Olaplex was acquired by Advent International.

On 30 September 2021, Olaplex was listed on the Nasdaq, raising 1.5 billion dollars after selling 73.7 million shares.

JuE Wong was the CEO from 2020 until 2023. In October 2023, Olaplex announced that Amanda Baldwin, former CEO of Supergoop, would be taking over in 2024 as CEO of Olaplex. John Bilbrey, executive chair on the board, will serve as interim CEO until 2024.

In 2026, Olaplex was acquired by Henkel for $1.4 billion at an offer price of $2.06 per share.

== Ingredients ==
All Olaplex products contain a patented ingredient called bis-aminopropyl diglycol dimaleate, with the aim of rebuilding broken hair disulfide bonds.

$\ce{C14H28N2O7}$

Bis-Aminopropyl Diglycol Dimaleate (BADGD) is a versatile and widely used ingredient in Olaplex’s products, known for its ability to repair and protect hair from chemical treatments and environmental stressors. It works by reinforcing disulfide bonds within the hair shaft, which are essential for strength and flexibility. When these bonds are damaged by different factors, BADGD reacts with cysteine residues in keratin to restore them, strengthening the hair from within. Additionally, it acts as a protective barrier, minimizing future damage caused by harsh chemicals.

BADGD is particularly beneficial for thick, curly, fine, or damaged hair, where its restorative effects are most noticeable. While its impact may be less evident on already healthy hair, incorporating it into a hair care routine helps maintain hair integrity and appearance. As a key ingredient in hair repair formulations, BADGD plays a crucial role in strengthening and revitalizing damaged hair by restoring its structural bonds and overall health.

== Lawsuits ==
In 2015, as Olaplex started to take off, it started talks with L'Oréal about a potential take over. The deal never went through, but Olaplex then sued L'Oréal for stealing trade secrets shared as part of the acquisition process. L'Oréal was found guilty in 2019, but the finding was overturned on appeal. The two companies finally settled outside of court.

In February 2023, 28 women filed a lawsuit against Olaplex claiming that the products led to damaged hair and hair loss. Part of the lawsuit stated that even after Olaplex reformulated their product to no longer include Lilial (a chemical that is potentially toxic for reproduction), they kept old product on the shelves and continued to sell it. Olaplex published results from third-party testing to show the products are safe. As of May 2023, no trial date had been set. By June 2023, a proposed class action lawsuit had over 100 plaintiffs. U.S. District Judge R. Gary Klausner ruled that the claims were too different for it to be a class action lawsuit and the first-named plaintiff dismissed her case without prejudice.

The 2023 lawsuits had a very negative impact on Olaplex' endorsements from the hairstylists' community, its sales, and the value of its share price (-89% by the end of 2023), a dramatic aftershock that had not been anticipated.
