= Craig Hawker =

Australian chemist (born 1964)

Craig Hawker: FRS; FRSC; FAAAS
- Born: 11 January 1964 (age 62); Queensland, Australia
- Awards: Rennie Memorial Medal; Centenary Prize

Academic background
- Education: University of Queensland; Cambridge University

Academic work
- Discipline: chemistry
- Sub-discipline: Synthetic polymer chemistry, nanotechnology
- Institutions: California NanoSystems Institute; Materials Research Laboratory; University of California, Santa Barbara

Craig Jon Hawker (born 11 January 1964) is an Australian-born chemist. His research has focused on the interface between organic and polymer chemistry, with emphasis on the design, synthesis, and application of well-defined macromolecular structures in biotechnology, microelectronics, and surface science. Hawker holds more than 45 U.S. patents, and he has co-authored over 300 papers in the areas of nanotechnology, materials science, and chemistry. He was listed as one of the top 100 most cited chemists worldwide over the decade 1992–2002, and again in 2000–2010.

In 2021, Hawker was elected a member of the National Academy of Engineering for contributions to polymer chemistry through synthetic organic chemistry concepts and the advancement of molecular engineering principles. He is the director of the California Nanosystems Institute and holds a number of other laboratory directorships at the University of California, Santa Barbara.

He was elected a member of the National Academy of Sciences in 2022.

== Education ==
Hawker was born in Australia and attended high school in Queensland. It was in high school that he developed his interest in chemistry because, as he put it, "it really allowed me to develop things with my hands. Chemistry is a very hands-on science." He studied at the University of Queensland and graduated with a Chemistry degree. He worked with Professor Alan R. Battersby at Cambridge University on his post-graduate studies achieving his PhD in bio-organic chemistry. Hawker then moved to the United States to pursue post-graduate work at Cornell University in 1988.

== Research history ==
The California NanoSystems Institute building with mural at the University of California, Santa Barbara

In 1990, Hawker returned to Queensland as a Queen Elizabeth II Research fellow at the University of Queensland. From 2004, he was a research staff member at the IBM Almaden Research Center in California. Hawker is the director of the California NanoSystems Institute, co-director of the Materials Research Laboratory, and the Alan and Ruth Heeger Professor of Interdisciplinary Science at the University of California, Santa Barbara.

== Influence and research focus ==
In 2012, Hawker won the Centenary Prize from the Royal Society for developing strategies for the design of new polymers, which has had a major influence in the area and on those studying polymers. In 2013, Hawker and another colleague invented Olaplex, a successful commercial product designed to relink hair bonds and to help reduce hair breakage. In 2018, Olaplex won a patent infringement action against L'Oréal. In 2015, Hawker was named as an American Association for the Advancement of Science fellow for "revolutionising materials research through the development of powerful synthetic methods and strategies for molecularly engineering functional macromolecules, inspiring scientists across multiple disciplines." He also serves or has served as editor for journals, such as the Journal of Polymer Science, and is on the editorial board for a number of journals of chemistry, including the International Journal of Polymeric Materials, and the Journal of Polymer Science Part A.

In 2017, Hawker was described as "one of the top materials scientists in the world, " In 2018, he and his colleagues developed a "3D-printing technique that can produce objects with both rigid and flexible properties will allow scientists to make bioinspired structures in just a single stage." This could lead to the development of structures with "mechanically and chemically distinct properties". Hawker is researching nanostructured materials in areas associated with microelectronics and biotechnology.

== Awards ==
- 2023: Honorary doctorate, Eindhoven University of Technology
- 2021: Member, National Academy of Engineering
- 2017: Charles G. Overberger International Prize for Excellence in Polymer Research
- 2016: Belgian Polymer Award
- 2016: Member of the National Academy of Inventors
- 2015: Fellow, American Association for the Advancement of Science (AAAS)
- 2013: ACS Award in Polymer Chemistry, American Chemical Society
- 2012: Centenary Prize, Royal Society of Chemistry
- 2011: Arthur C. Cope Scholar, American Chemical Society
- 2010: Fellow, Royal Society
- 2010: Fellow, American Chemical Society
- 2010: Polymer Division Fellow, American Chemical Society
- 2010: Named in top 100 most cited chemists (2000–2010)
- 2009: PMSE Fellow, American Chemical Society
- 2008: Inaugural DSM Performance Materials Award, International Union of Pure and Applied Chemistry
- 2007: Mark Scholar Award, American Chemical Society
- 2006: IBM Research Division Award
- 2005: Dutch Polymer Award, Dutch Chemical Institute
- 2004: Industrial Scientist Award, American Chemical Society
- 2003: Co-operative Research Award, American Chemical Society
- 2002: IBM Corporate Technical Recognition Award
- 2000: Young Scientists Award, International Union of Pure and Applied Chemistry
- 1999: Patent Invention Award, IBM Corporation
- 1997: Patent Invention Award, IBM Corporation
- 1995: Innovation Award, IBM Corporation
- 1992: Rennie Memorial Medal, Royal Australian Chemical Institute
- 1992: Research Award, Australian Research Council
- 1991: Treloar Prize, Polymer Division, Royal Australian Chemical Institute
- 1990: Queen Elizabeth II Research Fellowship, Australian Research Council
- 1985: 1851 Research Scholarship, Royal Commission for the Exhibition of 1851
- 1985: Overseas Research Scheme Award, Science and Engineering Research Council
- 1988: Science Fellow, Harkness Fellowships
- 1985: Commonwealth Scholarship and Fellowship Plan Award, British Council
- 1985: Masson Memorial Medal, Royal Australian Chemical Institute
- 1985: University Medal, University of Queensland1984 Poole Award, University of Queensland
- 1984: CSR Chemicals Prize, University of Queensland
- 1983: Douglas McNaughton Scholarship, University of Queensland
- 1983: T. G. H. Jones Scholarship, University of Queensland
- 1982: Edward Taylor Memorial Prize, University of Queensland
- 1981: Chemistry Prize, University of Queensland
