= Albert Lloyd George Rees =

Australian chemical physicist (1916–1989)

Albert Rees CBE FAA FRACI
- Born: Albert Lloyd George Rees; 15 January 1916; Melbourne, Victoria, Australis
- Died: 14 August 1989 (aged 73); North Balwyn, Victoria
- Education: Carey Baptist Grammar School
- Spouse: Marion
- Children: 3
- Scientific career
- Fields: Chemical physics
- Institutions: CSIRO

Albert Lloyd George Rees (15 January 1916 – 14 August 1989) was an Australian chemical physicist.

He was born the son of the Rev. G.P. Rees of Melbourne, Australia and educated at Carey Baptist Grammar School, at Kew, Victoria, Australia. He then worked part-time as a laboratory assistant at Melbourne University whilst studying for a Chemistry degree, which he obtained in 1936. After further study for an M.Sc (awarded in 1938) he travelled to England to work at Imperial College. As war had broken out en route he found himself investigating potential war gases, for which he was awarded a PhD in 1941.

After a few years of research at Philips Electrical Industries U.K., where he led a team studying problems associated with the manufacture of cathode ray tubes, he returned to Australia to take up a post at CSIR in Melbourne as leader of a new Section of Chemical Physics devoted to the application of physical techniques to chemical problems, including protein structure investigations, chemico-physical studies of the solid state, the determination of molecular structure and energetics, and the development of new and improved chemico-physical techniques. In 1958, having grown to a staff of 30 and equipped with X-ray diffraction equipment, a mass spectrometer, an ultra-violet and an infra-red spectrometer, the section became the Chemical Physics Division.

He was elected a fellow of the Australian Chemical Institute (FRACI) in 1948 and awarded their Rennie (1945), Smith (1951) and Leighton (1970) Medals. He became a fellow of the Australian Academy of Science (FAA) in 1954 and was awarded Commander of the Order of the British Empire (CBE) in 1978.

He retired from CSIRO in 1978 and died in 1989. He had married Marion Mofflin and had three daughters.

== Lloyd Rees Lecture ==
In 1990, the Council of the Australian Academy of Science agreed on the proposal of Sir Alan Walsh to initiate a series of lectures by distinguished researchers in chemical physics, to recognise the contributions of Rees to science, industry and education.

The award has been made to:

- 2018 — Paul Mulvaney
- 2016 — Keith Nugent
- 2014 — Cathy Foley
- 2012 — Joanne Etheridge
- 2010 — Stephen W. Wilkins
- 2008 — Michelle Simmons, Atomic electronics: When will scaling reach its limit?
- 2006 — Jose Varghese
- 2004 — Peter Hannaford
- 2002 — D. Cockayne
- 2000 — Peter Malcolm Colman
- 1998 — R.A. Lee
- 1996 — William R. Blevin
- 1993 — William Edwin James
- 1991 — John M. Cowley
