= Martina Stenzel =

Australian chemist

- Education: University of Bayreuth, University of Stuttgart
- Awards: Australian Laureate Fellowship, Liversidge Medal
- Scientific career
- Workplaces: University of New South Wales

Martina Heide Stenzel FAA is an Australian chemist. She is a Professor in the Department of Chemistry at the University of New South Wales (UNSW). She is also a Royal Australian Chemical Institute (RACI) University Ambassador. She became editor for the Australian Journal of Chemistry in 2008 and has served as Scientific Editor and as of 2021, as Editorial Board Chair of RSC Materials Horizons.

Stenzel studies polymer synthesis and applications of polymers in medicine, particularly the use of nanoparticles for drug delivery. She attempts to understand relationships between the structure of polymers and their properties. Stenzel was the first woman to be awarded the Liversidge Medal by the Royal Society of New South Wales, in the medal's 88 year history.

== Education ==
Stenzel studied chemistry (1990–1996) at the University of Bayreuth in Germany. After completing a master's degree in science, she continued her postgraduate studies at the Institute of Applied Macromolecular Chemistry at the University of Stuttgart. In 1999, Stenzel completed her PhD thesis on Synthesis and Characterization Cu(I) containing polyurethanes for the application as a carrier membrane for the separation of ethylene from gas mixtures.

== Career ==
Stenzel then moved to Australia to take up a postdoctoral fellows position at the UNESCO Centre for Membrane Science and Technology, at the University of New South Wales (UNSW). She became a lecturer there in 2002. She won an ARC Future Fellowship in 2009 and became a Full Professor as of 2012. She was promoted to co-director of the Centre for Advanced Macromolecular Design (CAMD) in 2013. In 2014, Stenzel joined the School of Chemistry at UNSW to build a research program focusing on polymeric nanomaterials and biomaterials.

== Research ==
Stenzel's research interests have shifted from pure polymer synthesis to the application of polymers in biomedicine particularly drug delivery.

Stenzel studies the use of nanoparticles to administer therapeutic drugs, developing a toolset for the design of very small nanoparticles. She attempts to understand relationships between the structure of polymers and their properties. Her work has implications for nanomedicine, catalysis and biosensors.

As of 2021 Stenzel has authored over 385 journal articles.

== Awards ==
- 2006 — Finalist of the Eureka Prize of the Australian Museum, Category "People's choice award" and "UNSW Eureka Prize for Scientific research"
- 2008 — David Sangster Polymer Science and Technology Achievement Award, RACI
- 2009 — ARC Future Fellow, Australian Research Council
- 2011 — Le Fèvre Memorial Prize (now LeFevre Medal) of the Australian Academy of Science
- 2012 — Polymer Division Citations (33APS), RACI
- 2013 — Excellence in Engineering and Information and Communications Technologies, NSW Science & Engineering Awards, New South Wales Government
- 2017 — HG Smith Memorial Award, Royal Australian Chemical Institute (RACI)
- 2018 — Elected Fellow of the Australian Academy of Science (FAA)
- 2020 — Australian Laureate Fellowship, Australian Research Council (ARC)
- 2020 — Archibald Liversidge Medal and Lecture of the Royal Society of New South Wales, for outstanding contribution to chemistry research
- 2025 — Batteard-Jordan Polymer Medal, Royal Australian Chemical Institute
