= David Parker (chemist) =

British chemist

David Parker FRS FRSC
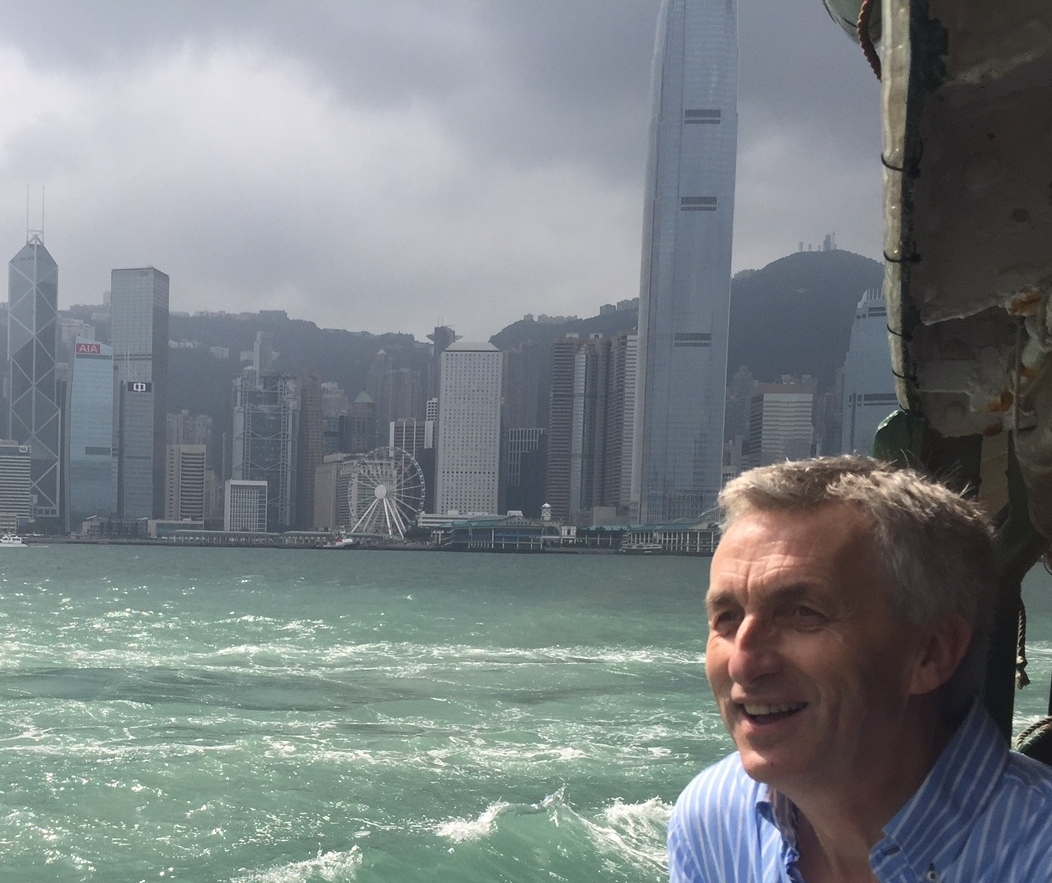
- Born: 30 July 1956 (age 70)
- Education: Durham Johnston School; King Edward VI High School, Stafford
- Alma mater: University of Oxford (MA, DPhil)
- Awards: Corday-Morgan Prize (1987)
- Scientific career
- Workplaces: Durham University; Hong Kong Baptist University
- Thesis: Studies in asymmetric catalysis (1980)
- Academic advisors: Jean-Marie Lehn, John M Brown
- Doctoral students: Elizabeth New
- Website: chem.hkbu.edu.hk

David Parker (aged 70)

David Parker MA DPhil DSc FRS FRSC (born 30 July 1956) is an English chemist who is Chair Professor at Hong Kong Baptist University, and Emeritus Professor at Durham University.

== Early life and education ==
David Parker was born in Leadgate, County Durham. He grew up in Durham, England and was educated at Durham Johnston School and briefly at King Edward VI High School, Stafford. Having gained an Open Exhibition to Christ Church, Oxford, he read chemistry at the University of Oxford, where he gained a First Class degree in 1978, and a DPhil in 1980, working with John Brown FRS, based on mechanistic studies in asymmetric catalysis.

== Career and research ==
In 1980, he was appointed to a NATO Fellowship to work with Jean-Marie Lehn (Nobel Prize, 1987), and was appointed to a Lectureship in Chemistry at Durham University, beginning in January 1982. He is currently Emeritus Professor at Durham University, and has been Chair Professor of Chemistry at Hong Kong Baptist University since September 2022.

Parker's research investigates the design and synthesis of chiral functional molecules, luminescent rare earth complexes as well as imaging and therapeutic conjugates . The work has straddled the traditional disciplines of physical, organic and inorganic chemistry. Often collaborating with European and UK industry, notably with Bracco s.a. in Italy and Cisbio Bioassays (now Revitty) in France, Parker has worked on collaborative projects leading to the introduction of imaging and therapeutic agents, including the monoclonal antibody conjugate MyloTarg.

== Awards and honours ==
Parker gained recognition from the Royal Society of Chemistry, being awarded, among other prizes, the Corday-Morgan Medal (1987), the Hickinbottom Award (1988), an Interdisciplinary Award (RSC, 1996), a Tilden Lectureship (2003) and the Ludwig Mond Prize and Medal (2011). In 2002 he was elected a Fellow of the Royal Society (FRS) and gained the ICI Prize in Organic Chemistry in 1991 and the Lecoq de Boisbaudran senior prize in rare earth science in 2012. In 2014, he was made an EPSRC RISE Fellow, recognising inspiration in science and engineering. He was awarded an honorary Doctor Of Science degree by Durham University in July 2026.
