= Journal of Materials Chemistry A =

- Discipline: Materials science
- Language: English
- Edited by: Anders Hagfeldt

Publication details
- History: 2013–present
- Publisher: Royal Society of Chemistry (United Kingdom)
- Frequency: Weekly
- Impact factor: 11.9 (2022)

Standard abbreviations
- ISO 4: J. Mater. Chem. A

Indexing
- CODEN: JMCAET
- ISSN: 2050-7488
- OCLC no.: 820938144

Links
- Journal homepage

The Journal of Materials Chemistry A is a weekly peer-reviewed scientific journal that covers the synthesis, properties, and applications of novel materials related to energy and sustainability. It is one of three journals created after the Journal of Materials Chemistry was split at the end of 2012. Its first issue was published in January 2013. The journal is published by the Royal Society of Chemistry and has two sister journals, Journal of Materials Chemistry B and Journal of Materials Chemistry C, which cover different materials science topics. The editor-in-chief for the Journal of Materials Chemistry family of journals is currently Nazario Martin. The deputy editor-in-chief for Journal of Materials Chemistry A is Anders Hagfeldt, while the executive editor is Michaela Mühlberg.

== Abstracting and indexing ==
The journal is abstracted and indexed in the Science Citation Index Expanded, Current Contents/Physical, Chemical & Earth Sciences, and Current Contents/Engineering, Computing & Technology.

== See also ==
- List of scientific journals in chemistry
- Materials Horizons
- Journal of Materials Chemistry B
- Journal of Materials Chemistry C
- Soft Matter
