= Christopher Barner-Kowollik =

German-Australian materials scientist

Professor Christopher Barner-Kowollik FAA FRACI FRSC

Personal details
- Born: 1973 (age 52–53) West Germany
- Occupation: Materials scientist Photochemist

Christopher Barner-Kowollik (born 1973) is a German–Australian materials scientist who is a former Australian Research Council Laureate Fellow working in macromolecular photochemistry. He is currently an Alexander-von-Humboldt Professor and Institute Director at the Karlsruhe Institute of Technology (KIT) and a former Deputy Vice-Chancellor and Vice-President (Research) of the Queensland University of Technology (QUT). He holds a fractional appointment as Distinguished Professor within the School of Chemistry and Physics at the QUT in Brisbane. From 2017 to 2024 he was editor-in-chief of the Royal Society of Chemistry (RSC) journal Polymer Chemistry, and is an editor for the RSC's journal Chemical Science. He is a principal investigator within the Soft Matter Materials Laboratory at QUT.

== Education and career ==
After his undergraduate studies of chemistry at the Universities of Constance and Goettingen (Germany), Christopher Barner-Kowollik earned his PhD in physical chemistry (Dr. rer. nat.) from the University of Goettingen in 1999. Following postdoctoral research with Tom Davis at the University of New South Wales, he held academic positions at the Centre for Advanced Macromolecular Design (CAMD), and was appointed Full Professor of Polymer Chemistry in 2006 at the same institution. In 2008, he moved back to Germany, where he became the Chair of Macromolecular Chemistry at the Karlsruhe Institute of Technology (KIT). There he was the founding director of the Collaborative Research Centre SFB 1176 'Molecular Structuring of Soft Matter' established by the German Research Council (DFG). He is a founding PI and thrust speaker in the DFG Excellence Cluster 3D Matter Made to Order.

Barner-Kowollik relocated in 2017 to the Queensland University of Technology (QUT), where he was awarded an Australian Laureate Fellowship and appointed Director of QUT's Soft Matter Materials Laboratory. He was an associate group leader at the KIT's Institute of Nanotechnology and the Institute of Polymer Chemistry and Chemical Technology, after heading a full research group at the KIT until 2020. In December 2019 Barner-Kowollik was appointed Deputy Vice-Chancellor Research and Vice-President of QUT, from September 2022 to January 2025 he additionally held the role of Senior Deputy Vice Chancellor and Vice-President. He is currently an Alexander-von-Humboldt Professor and Institute Director at the Karlsruhe Institute of Technology (KIT).

== Research ==
Barner-Kowollik's research was initially in the field of polymer chemistry and polymer reaction kinetics. Over the course of his career, his research has fused polymer chemistry with organic and photochemistry. These research areas include the development of wavelength-orthogonal, -synergistic, -cooperative and -antagonistic reactions, and their photophysical understanding. His research established the field of highly wavelength-resolved photochemical action plots for photochemical covalent bond formation and cleavage. The development of photochemical action plots demonstrated that molecular absorptivity and photochemical reactivity are oftentimes disparate, which has significant implications for the photochemical synthesis of highly defined macromolecular architectures. The developed photochemical platforms – including out-of-equilibrium light stabilized dynamic materials (LSDMs) - find application for the design of 2D and 3D photolithographic processes as well as in biosystems including single cell scaffolds. Examples of precision photochemistry from his laboratory range from synergistically operating covalent bond forming systems and photoresins requiring two colours of light to cure and examples of pathway independent wavelength orthogonal reaction systems to using different colours of light to selectively adapt soft matter material properties. Christopher Barner-Kowollik has published over 800 peer-reviewed research papers, which have been cited close to 53,300 times.

== Awards and recognition ==
- 2004 Rennie Memorial Medal of the Australian Academy of Science
- 2005 Edgeworth David Medal of the Royal Society of New South Wales
- 2006 Finalist of the Australian Museum Eureka UNSW Prize for Scientific Research
- 2006 Finalist of the Australian Museum Eureka Prize People's Choice Award
- 2007 UNSW Faculty of Engineering Research Excellence Award
- 2007 COSMOS Bright Sparks Award
- 2007 Australian Professorial Fellowship, Australian Research Council (ARC)
- 2012 International Biannual Belgian Polymer Award
- 2016 Erwin Schrödinger Award of the Helmholtz Association, jointly with M. Wegener and M. Bastmeyer
- 2017 Australian Laureate Fellowship, Australian Research Council (ARC)
- 2019 QUT Vice-Chancellor's Award for Leadership Excellence
- 2019 Elected Fellow of the Australian Academy of Science
- 2020 United Kingdom Macro Group Medal
- 2022 Distinguished Professor (QUT)
- 2022 HG Smith Medal of the Royal Australian Chemical Institute (RACI)
- 2022 David Craig Medal of the Australian Academy of Science
- 2022 European Polymer Federation Prize
- 2023 Centenary Prize of the Royal Society of Chemistry (RSC)
- 2023 CNRS Ambassador of Chemical Sciences in France
- 2025 Alexander von Humboldt Professorship

== Elected fellowships ==
- Fellow of the Queensland Academy of Arts and Sciences (FQA)
- Fellow of the Australian Academy of Science (FAA)
- Fellow of the Royal Society of Chemistry (FRSC)
- Fellow of the Royal Australian Chemical Institute (FRACI)
- Fellow of the Leibniz Institute of Polymer Research (Dresden, Germany)
