= Biomaterials Science =

- Discipline: Materials science
- Language: English
- Edited by: Jianjun Cheng

Publication details
- History: 2013–present
- Publisher: Royal Society of Chemistry (United Kingdom)
- Impact factor: 6.6 (2022)

Standard abbreviations
- ISO 4: Biomater. Sci.

Indexing
- ISSN: 2047-4830 (print); 2047-4849 (web)
- LCCN: 2013205235

Links
- Journal homepage; Online archive

Biomaterials Science is a peer-reviewed scientific journal that explores the underlying science behind the function, interactions and design of biomaterials. It is published by the Royal Society of Chemistry. The current editor-in-chief is Jianjun Cheng (Westlake University, China), while the executive editor is Maria Southall.

The journal was established in 2013 and since January 2018 has been the official journal of the European Society for Biomaterials. Since the start of 2016 the journal has been online only. It publishes primary research (Communications and full paper articles) and review-type articles (reviews and minireviews).

== Abstracting and indexing ==
The journal is abstracted and indexed in:

- Science Citation Index
- Index Medicus/MEDLINE/PubMed
- Scopus

== See also ==
- List of scientific journals in chemistry
- Journal of Materials Chemistry B
- MedChemComm
