= Gautam R. Desiraju =

Indian structural chemist (born 1952)

Gautam R Desiraju
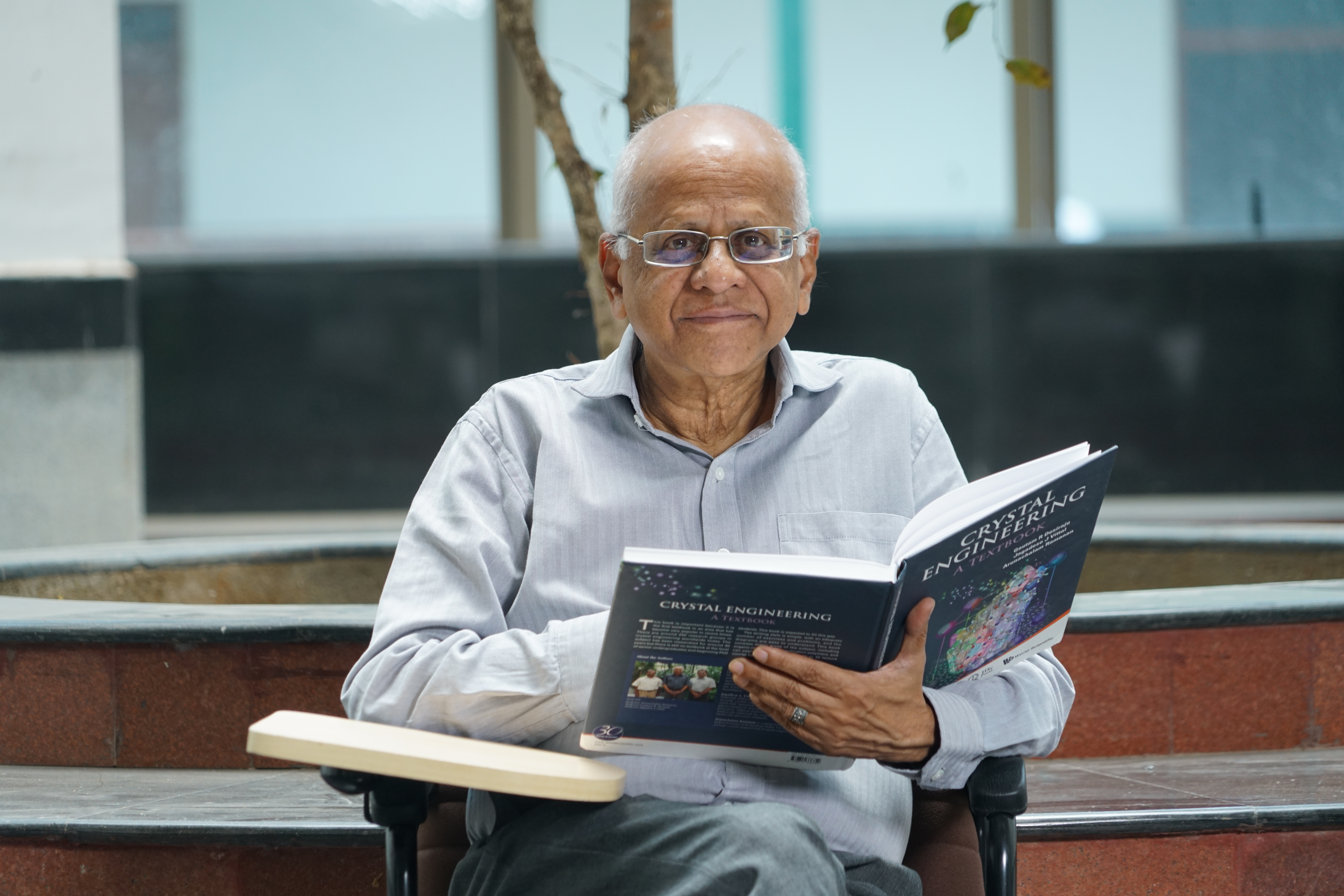
- Born: August 21, 1952 (age 74); Madras, Tamil Nadu, India
- Education: University of Bombay, University of Illinois
- Known for: Crystal Engineering, Hydrogen Bonding
- Scientific career
- Fields: Chemistry, X-ray Crystallography
- Workplaces: Indian Institute of Science, University of Hyderabad

Gautam Radhakrishna Desiraju is an Indian scientist and an emeritus professor at the Indian Institute of Science (IISc). His research is on crystal engineering and weak hydrogen bonds. In March 2026 he was awarded the 14th Ewald Prize of the International Union of Crystallography, the organization's highest award, given every three years.

== Biography ==
Gautam Desiraju was born in Chennai, India. After schooling at Cathedral and John Connon Boys School in Bombay, he obtained a B.Sc. from St. Xavier's College, Bombay in 1972. Under the guidance of David Y. Curtin and Iain C. Paul, he gained a PhD in 1976 from the University of Illinois at Urbana-Champaign. He worked between 1976 and 1978 at the research laboratories of Eastman Kodak Company in Rochester, N.Y., U.S.A. From 1978 to 1979, he was a research fellow at the Indian Institute of Science, Bangalore. In 1979, he joined the University of Hyderabad as a lecturer, was promoted to reader in 1984, and became a professor in 1990. After 30 years at the University of Hyderabad, he joined the Indian Institute of Science in Bangalore in 2009.

Desiraju has guided the PhD work of about 40 students and mentored about 100 postdoctoral associates. He has authored more than 475 research papers.

He is a member of the editorial advisory boards of Chemical Communications and the Journal of the American Chemical Society. He is the editor-in-chief of Polyhedron. He chaired the first Gordon Research Conferences on Crystal Engineering in 2010 and served as president of the International Union of Crystallography from 2011 to 2014. In August 2017, he organised the 24th Congress and General Assembly of the International Union of Crystallography in Hyderabad, India.

Desiraju has received honorary doctorate degrees from Universidad Nacional de Córdoba, Argentina, Rayalaseema University, Kurnool, and Gulbarga University, Kalaburagi. He has won international awards such as the Alexander von Humboldt Forschungspreis and the TWAS award in Chemistry. He was awarded the Acharya P. C. Ray Medal (2015) by the University of Calcutta for innovation in science and technology, the ISA Medal (2018) for Science by the University of Bologna, and the Van der Waals Prize (2023) by ICNI, Strasbourg.

== Scholarly contributions ==
Desiraju's contributions to crystal engineering have focused on the concept of the supramolecular synthon.

Desiraju has authored several commentaries on science, the evolution of chemistry as a subject, its emergence, complexity and practices. He has also written articles about the state of science education and research in India and the current status of chemistry research in the country, identifying problems and suggesting solutions for issues that stem from, amongst other parameters, the dichotomy between traditional values and the aspiration of an ancient culture to advance scientifically like the west. Despite being educated in America, Desiraju has advocated therefore, inculcating a sense of "Indian-ness" and self-worth in Indian students and young scientists towards a better understanding of India's place in our contemporary world.
