= Alfred J. Crosby =

American materials scientist

- Born: Alfred J. Crosby
- Education: University of Virginia (B.S.), Northwestern University (Ph.D.)
- Known for: Geckskin™, Soft matter mechanics
- Awards: Fellow of the American Physical Society, Fellow of the Royal Society of Chemistry, National Academy of Inventors Fellow
- Scientific career
- Fields: Polymer science, Materials science
- Workplaces: University of Massachusetts Amherst
- Doctoral advisor: Kenneth R. Shull

Alfred J. Crosby is an American materials scientist and professor at the University of Massachusetts Amherst, where he serves as the Department Head of Polymer Science and Engineering. He is recognized for his contributions to the mechanics of soft materials, particularly in adhesion and bioinspired materials design.

== Education ==
Crosby earned his B.S. in Civil Engineering from the University of Virginia in 1996 and his Ph.D. in Materials Science and Engineering from Northwestern University in 2000.

== Career and research ==
He joined the faculty at UMass Amherst in 2002 and has since advanced to full professor and department head.

Crosby's research focuses on bioinspired adhesion and friction, growth and assembly, mechanics of gels, tissues, and thin films, and autonomous movement in soft materials. His work on Geckskin™, a synthetic adhesive inspired by gecko feet, has garnered significant attention.

Since January 2022, Crosby has served as the Editor-in-Chief of Soft Matter, a peer-reviewed journal published by the Royal Society of Chemistry.

== Honors and awards ==
Crosby is a Fellow of the American Physical Society, the Royal Society of Chemistry, and the National Academy of Inventors. He has received several awards, including the Adhesion Society's Outstanding Young Scientist Award and the National Science Foundation CAREER Award.
