= Karen Faulds =

Analytical chemist

Karen Faulds FRSE
- Born: Karen Jane Faulds
- Education: University of Strathclyde
- Awards: Nexxus Young Life Scientist of the Year (2009) Joseph Black Award (2013) Top 50 Women in Analytical Science (2016) Coblentz Society Craver Award (2016) The Analytical Scientist Top 10 Spectroscopists (2017) Elected Fellow of the Royal Society of Edinburgh (FRSE)]] (2018)
- Scientific career
- Fields: Analytical chemistry
- Workplaces: University of Strathclyde
- Thesis: Detection of drugs of abuse by surface enhanced Raman scattering (SERS) (2004)
- Website: www.strath.ac.uk/staff/fauldskarendr

Karen Jane Faulds FRSE is a Scottish academic and professor of analytical chemistry at the University of Strathclyde. She develops surface-enhanced Raman spectroscopy (SERS) for bioanalysis, and has won several awards for her research, including the Coblentz Society Craver Award.

== Early life and education ==
Faulds studied forensic and analytical science at the University of Strathclyde, graduating with a BSc in 1998. She remained at Strathclyde for her doctoral studies and in 2003 received her PhD for research on the detection of drugs of substance abuse using surface-enhanced Raman spectroscopy (SERS).

== Career and research ==
Faulds worked as a postdoctoral researcher for Duncan Graham on the detection of DNA using surface-enhanced resonant Raman spectroscopy (SERRS). She became increasingly interested in the use of analytical chemistry to improve people's lives. Faulds was appointed as a lecturer in 2006.

Faulds was promoted to Reader in 2012 and Professor in 2015. Faulds works on the development of surface-enhanced Raman spectroscopy (SERS) for analytical detection. SERSs permits multiplexed and sensitive biological analysis. Her work uses signal amplification methods for the quantitative analysis of biomolecules, as the sensitivity allows her to detect target DNA and proteins. SERS also allows Faulds to make multiple measurements of different analytes in one sample. In 2015 she was the first woman and youngest person to ever be elected chair of the Infrared and Raman Discussion Group (IRDG). She has described C. V. Raman as her "hero of spectroscopy".

Her recent work has looked at the optical detection of Listeria using bionanosensors. The bionanosensors permit the multiplexed detection of pathogens, which can remove the risk of infectious diseases without the need for antimicrobial drugs. She covers SERS active magnetic nanoparticles with lectins, which can recognise and bind to carbohydrates in bacteria. These nanoparticles can collect and concentrate bacteria from production lines. Silver nanoparticles are functionalised with a biorecognition molecule, such as an aptamer, and Raman reporter, resulting in a SERS signal when a nanoparticle binds to the bacterial target. The magnetic component can then be studied further using portable Raman spectrometers.

Faulds is a founding member of Renishaw plc diagnostics, a University of Strathclyde spin-off company, and serves as its Director of Research. Faulds joined the editorial board of RSC Advances in November 2016 and as associate editor of Analyst in August 2020. She co-directs the Engineering and Physical Sciences Research Council (EPSRC) and Medical Research Council (MRC) Centre for Doctoral Training (CDT) in Optical Medical Imaging, shared between the University of Edinburgh and the University of Strathclyde.

== Awards and honours ==
- 2009 Nexxus Young Life Scientist of the Year
- 2013 Royal Society of Chemistry (RSC) Joseph Black Award
- 2016 Top 50 Women in Analytical Science
- 2016 Coblentz Society Craver Award
- 2017 The Analytical Scientist Top 10 Spectroscopists
- 2018 Elected Fellow of the Royal Society of Edinburgh (FRSE)
- 2023 The Analytical Scientist the Power List - Connectors and Interdisciplinarians

Faulds is a Fellow of the Society for Applied Spectroscopy (SAS) and a member of the Young Academy of Scotland (YAS).

In 2019 Faulds was included in the 2019 Power List of The Analytical Scientist.
