= Polymer Chemistry (journal) =

- Discipline: Materials science, Polymer chemistry
- Language: English
- Edited by: Christopher Barner-Kowollik

Publication details
- History: 2010-present
- Publisher: Royal Society of Chemistry (United Kingdom)
- Frequency: Weekly
- Impact factor: 4.6 (2022)

Standard abbreviations
- ISO 4: Polym. Chem.

Indexing
- ISSN: 1759-9954 (print); 1759-9962 (web)

Links
- Journal homepage

Polymer Chemistry is a peer-reviewed scientific journal published by the Royal Society of Chemistry covering all aspects of the chemistry of synthetic and biological macromolecules and related emerging areas. It was established in February 2010 as a monthly journal and switched to biweekly in 2013. The editor-in-chief is Christopher Barner-Kowollik (Queensland University of Technology), while the executive editor is Neil Hammond. According to the Journal Citation Reports, the journal has a 2021 impact factor of 5.364.

== See also ==
- List of scientific journals in chemistry
- Soft Matter
