= Crystal engineering =

Designing solid structures with tailored properties

Crystal engineering studies the design and synthesis of solid-state structures with desired properties through deliberate control of intermolecular interactions. It is an interdisciplinary academic field, bridging solid-state and supramolecular chemistry.

The main engineering strategies currently in use are hydrogen- and halogen bonding and coordination bonding. These may be understood with key concepts such as the supramolecular synthon and the secondary building unit.

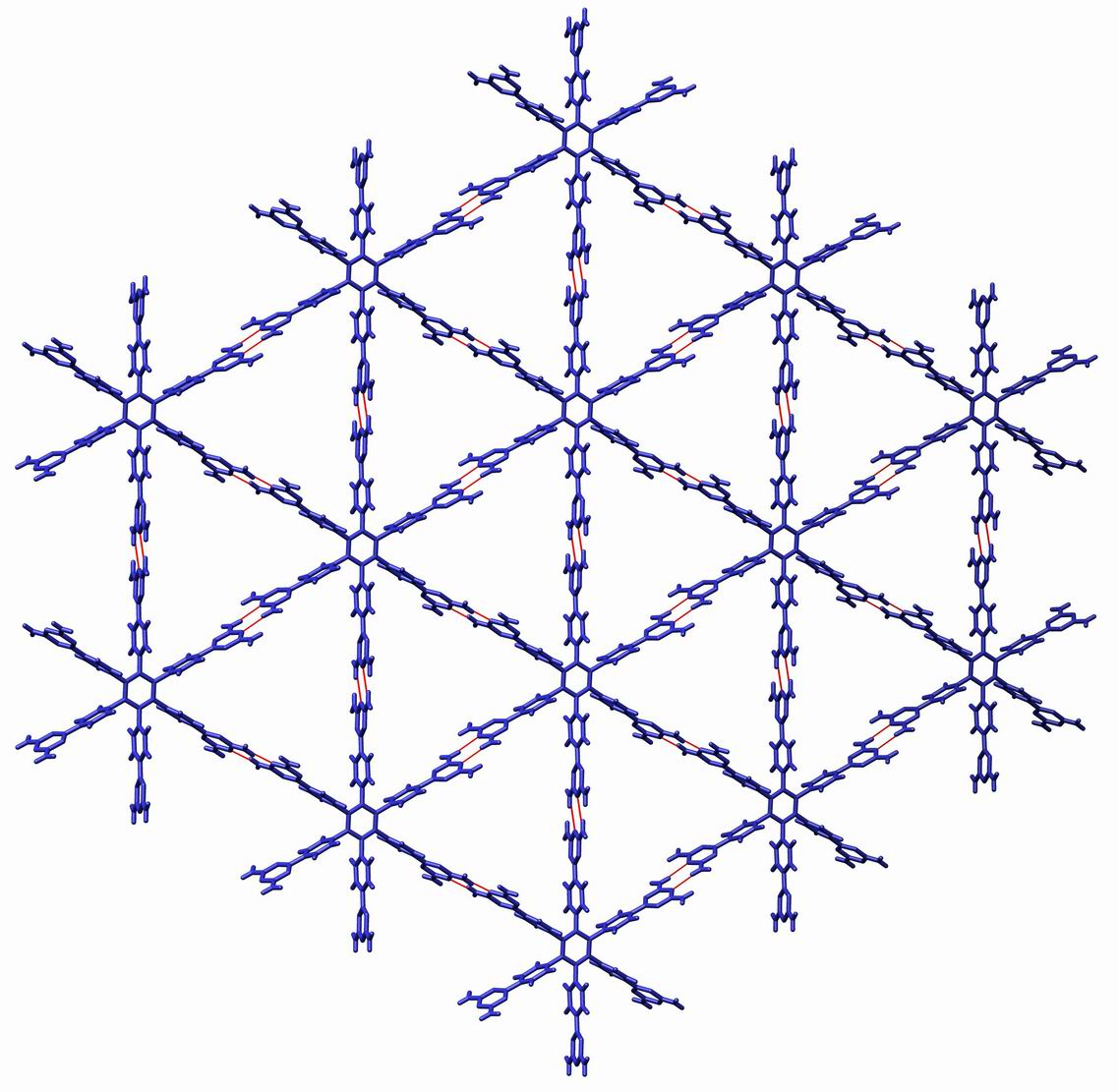
An example of crystal engineering using hydrogen bonding reported by Wuest and coworkers in J. Am. Chem. Soc., 2007, 4306–4322.

== History of term ==
The term 'crystal engineering' was first used in 1955 by R. Pepinsky but the starting point is often credited to Gerhard Schmidt in connection with photodimerization reactions in crystalline cinnamic acids. Since this initial use, the meaning of the term has broadened considerably to include many aspects of solid state supramolecular chemistry. A useful modern definition is that provided by Gautam Desiraju, who in 1988 defined crystal engineering as "the understanding of intermolecular interactions in the context of crystal packing and the utilization of such understanding in the design of new solids with desired physical and chemical properties." Since many of the bulk properties of molecular materials are dictated by the manner in which the molecules are ordered in the solid state, it is clear that an ability to control this ordering would afford control over these properties.

== Non-covalent control of structure ==
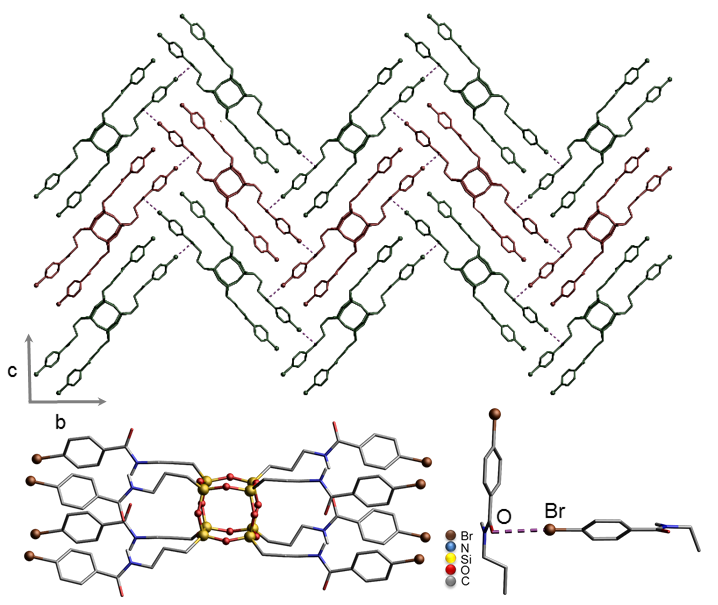
Br···O halogen bonds observed in crystal structure of 3D silsesquioxanes.

Crystal engineering relies on noncovalent bonding to achieve the organization of molecules and ions in the solid state. Much of the initial work on purely organic systems focused on the use of hydrogen bonds, although coordination and halogen bonds provide additional control in crystal design.

Molecular self-assembly is at the heart of crystal engineering, and it typically involves an interaction between complementary hydrogen bonding faces or a metal and a ligand. "Supramolecular synthons" are building blocks that are common to many structures and hence can be used to order specific groups in the solid state.

== Design of multi-component crystals ==
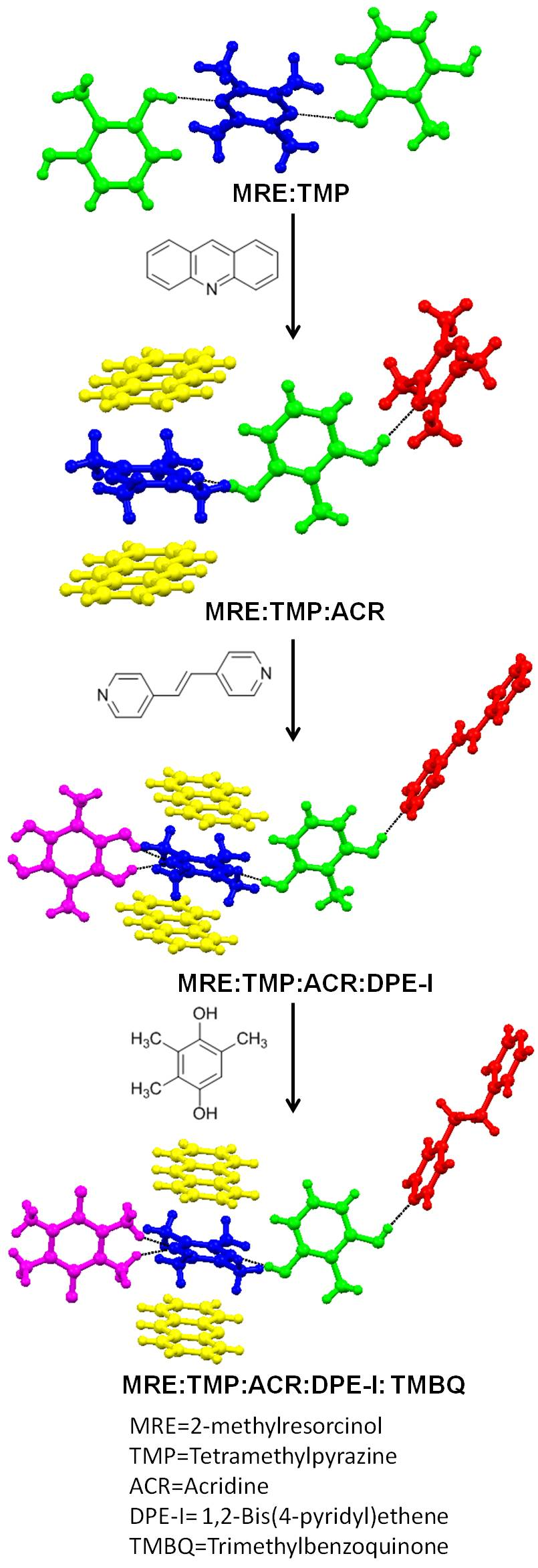
A five component crystal was designed by Desiraju and co workers by a rational retrosynthetic strategy (IUCrJ, 2016, 3, 96–101).

The intentional synthesis of cocrystals is most often achieved with strong heteromolecular interactions. The main relevance of multi-component crystals is focused upon designing pharmaceutical cocrystals. Pharmaceutical cocrystals are generally composed of one API (Active Pharmaceutical Ingredient) with other molecular substances that are considered safe according to the guidelines provided by WHO (World Health Organization). Various properties (such as solubility, bioavailability, permeability) of an API can be modulated through the formation of pharmaceutical cocrystals.

== In two dimensions ==
2D architectures (i.e., molecularly thick architectures) is a branch of crystal engineering. The formation (often referred as molecular self-assembly depending on its deposition process) of such architectures lies in the use of solid interfaces to create adsorbed monolayers. Such monolayers may feature spatial crystallinity. However the dynamic and wide range of monolayer morphologies ranging from amorphous to network structures have made of the term (2D) supramolecular engineering a more accurate term. Specifically, supramolecular engineering refers to "(The) design (of) molecular units in such way that a predictable structure is obtained" or as "the design, synthesis and self-assembly of well defined molecular modules into tailor-made supramolecular architectures".

Scanning probe microscopic techniques enable visualization of two dimensional assemblies.

== Polymorphism ==
Polymorphism, the phenomenon wherein the same chemical compound exists in more than one crystal forms, is relevant commercially because polymorphic forms of drugs may be entitled to independent patent protection. The importance of crystal engineering to the pharmaceutical industry is expected to grow exponentially.

Polymorphism arises due to the competition between kinetic and thermodynamic factors during crystallization. While long-range strong intermolecular interactions dictate the formation of kinetic crystals, the close packing of molecules generally drives the thermodynamic outcome. Understanding this dichotomy between the kinetics and thermodynamics constitutes the focus of research related to the polymorphism.

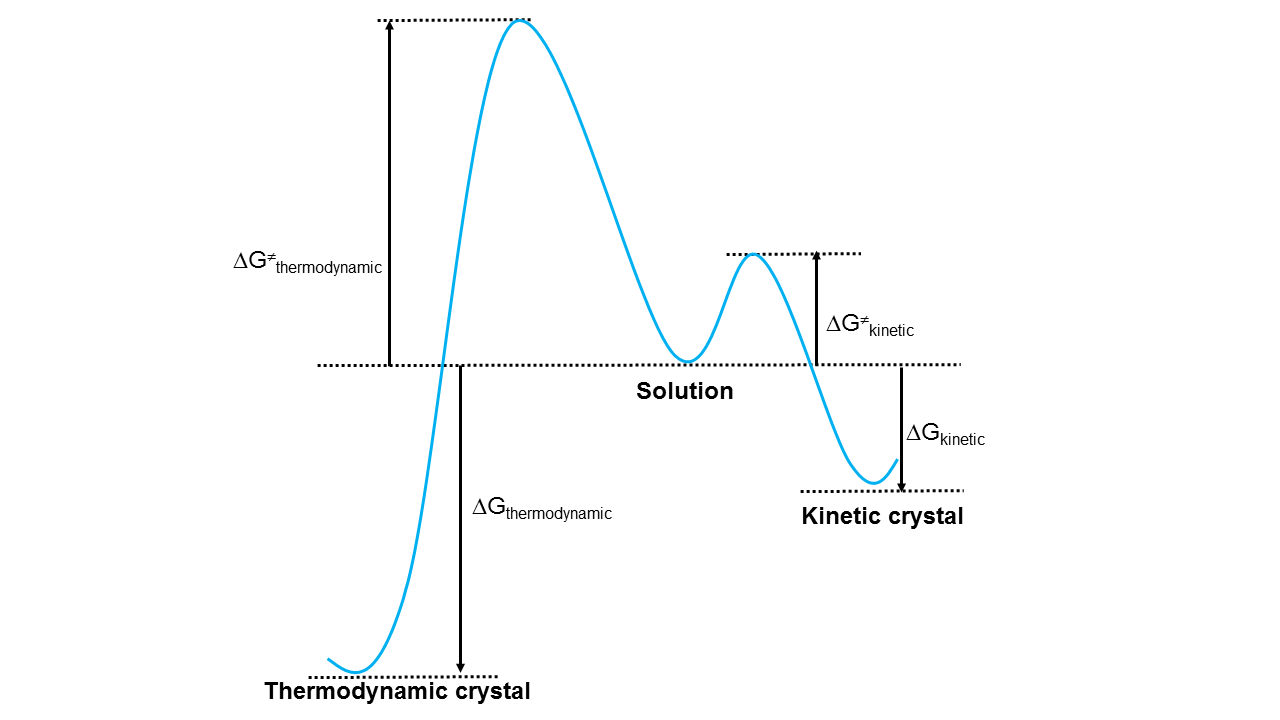
The pathways to kinetically favoured and thermodynamically favoured crystals.

In organic molecules, three types of polymorphism are mainly observed. Packing polymorphism arises when molecules pack in different ways to give different structures. Conformational polymorphism, on the other hand is mostly seen in flexible molecules where molecules have multiple conformational possibilities within a small energy window. As a result, multiple crystal structures can be obtained with the same molecule but in different conformations. The rarest form of polymorphism arises from the differences in the primary synthon and this type of polymorphism is called as synthon polymorphism.

== Crystal structure prediction ==
Crystal structure prediction (CSP) is a computational approach to generate energetically feasible crystal structures (with corresponding space group and positional parameters) from a given molecular structure. The CSP exercise is considered most challenging as "experimental" crystal structures are very often kinetic structures and therefore are very difficult to predict. In this regard, many protocols have been proposed and are tested through several blind tests organized by CCDC since 2002. A major advance in the CSP happened in 2007 while a hybrid method based on tailor made force fields and density functional theory (DFT) was introduced. In the first step, this method employs tailor made force fields to decide upon the ranking of the structures followed by a dispersion corrected DFT method to calculate the lattice energies precisely.

Apart from the ability of predicting crystal structures, CSP also gives computed energy landscapes of crystal structures where many structures lie within a narrow energy window. This kind of computed landscapes lend insights into the study on polymorphism, design of new structures and also help to design crystallization experiments.

== Property design ==
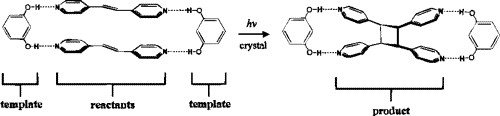
A resorcinol based templating strategy described by Macgillivray and co workers to illustrate the control of photodimerization outcome, J. Am. Chem. Soc., 2000, 122, 7817-7818.

The design of crystal structures with desired properties is the ultimate goal of crystal engineering. Crystal engineering principles have been applied to the design of non-linear optical materials, especially those with second harmonic generation (SHG) properties. Using supramolecular synthons, supramolecular gels have been designed.

== Mechanical properties of crystalline materials ==
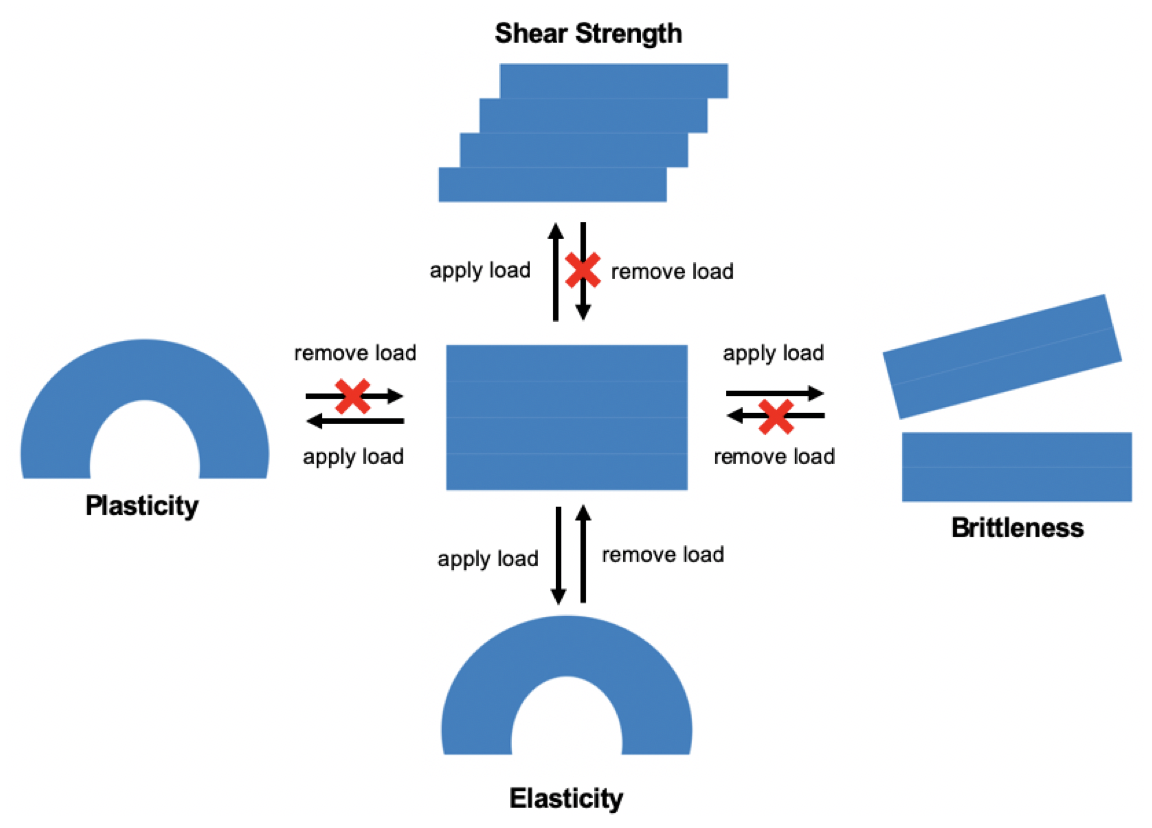
Four mechanical properties of crystalline materials: shear strength, plasticity, elasticity, and brittleness. Information adapted from Saha et al. 2018.

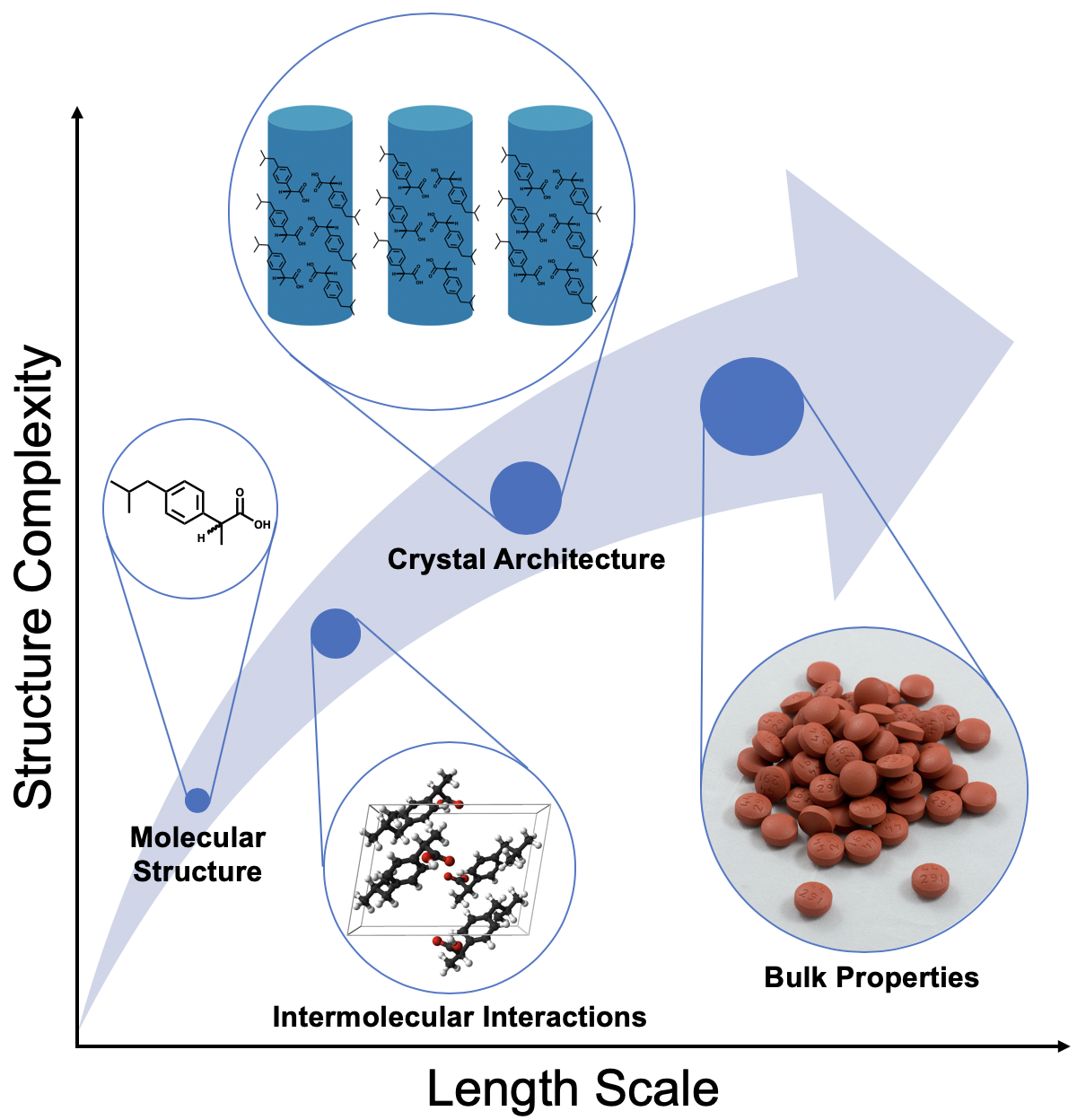
Designing a material with targeted mechanical properties requires command over complex structures across a range of length scales.

Designing a crystalline material with targeted properties requires an understanding of the material's molecular and crystal features in relation to its mechanical properties. Four mechanical properties are of interest for crystalline materials: plasticity, elasticity, brittleness, and shear strength).

=== Intermolecular interactions ===
Manipulation of the intermolecular interaction network is a means for controlling bulk properties. During crystallization, intermolecular interactions form according to an electrostatic hierarchy. Strong hydrogen bonds are the primary director for crystal organization.

==== Crystal architecture ====
Typically, the strongest intermolecular interactions form the molecular layers or columns and the weakest intermolecular interactions form the slip plane. For example, long chains or layers of acetaminophen molecules form due to the hydrogen bond donors and acceptors that flank the benzene ring. The weaker interactions between the chains or layers of acetaminophen required less energy to break than the hydrogen bonds. As a result, a slip plane is formed.

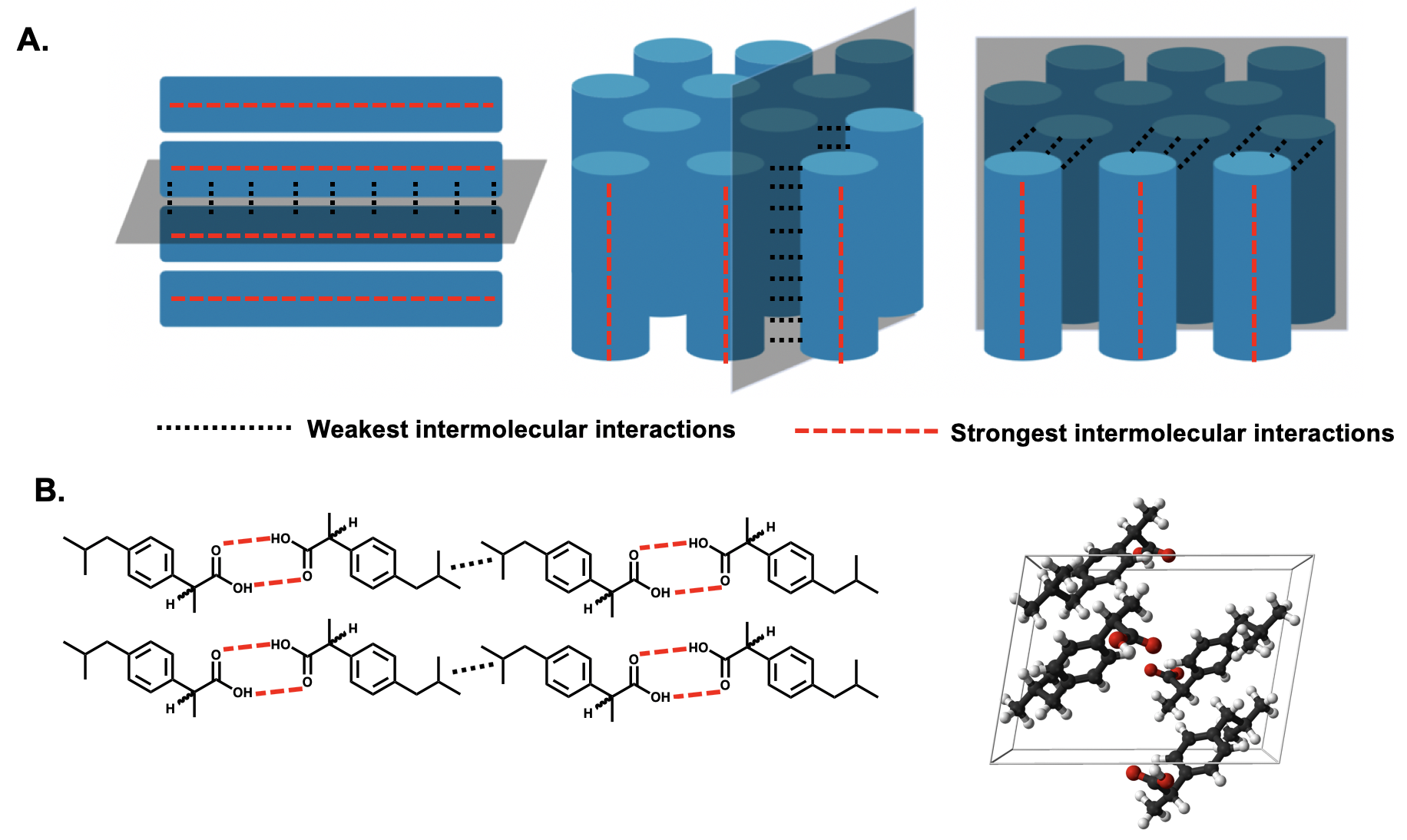
A. Slip planes associated with layered or columnar architectural features in crystalline materials. Red dotted and black dashed lines represent the direction of the weakest and strongest intermolecular interactions, respectively, which influences the slip plane. B. Example of the strongest (hydrogen bonds) and weakest (van der Waals) interactions in acetaminophen structure that influences the crystal structure.

A supramolecular synthon is a pair of molecules that form relatively strong intermolecular interactions in the early phases of crystallization; these molecule pairs are the basic structural motif found in a crystal lattice.

==== Defects or imperfections ====
Lattice defects, such as point defects, tilt boundaries, or dislocations, create imperfections in crystal architecture and topology. Any disruption to the crystal structure alters the mechanism or degree of molecular movement, thereby changing the mechanical properties of the material. Examples of point imperfections include vacancies, substitutional impurities, interstitial impurities, Frenkel’s defects, and Schottky’s defects. Examples of line imperfections include edge and screw dislocations.

==== Assessing Crystal Structure ====
Crystallographic methods, such as X-ray diffraction, are used to elucidate the crystal structure of a material by quantifying distances between atoms. The X-ray diffraction technique relies on a particular crystal structure creating a unique pattern after X-rays are diffracted through the crystal lattice. Microscopic methods, such as optical, electron, field ion, and scanning tunneling microscopy, can be used to visualize the microstructure, imperfections, or dislocations of a material. Ultimately, these methods elaborate on the growth and assembly of crystallites during crystallization, which can be used to rationalize the movement of crystallites in response to an applied load. Calorimetric methods, such as differential scanning calorimetry, use induce phase transitions in order to quantify the associated changes in enthalpy, entropy, and Gibb's free energy. The melting and fusion phase transitions are dependent on the lattice energy of the crystalline material, which can be used to determine percent crystallinity of the sample. Raman spectroscopy is a method that uses light scattering to interact with bonds in a sample. This technique provides information about chemical bonds, intermolecular interactions, and crystallinity.

==== Assessing mechanical properties ====
Nanoindentation is a standard and widely accepted method for measuring mechanical properties within the crystal engineering field. The method quantifies hardness, elasticity, packing anisotropy, and polymorphism of a crystalline material. Hirshfeld surfaces are visual models of electron density at a specific isosurface that aid in visualizing and quantifying intermolecular interactions. An advantage to using Hirshfeld surfaces in crystal engineering is that these surface maps are embedded with information about a molecular and its neighbors. The insight into molecular neighbors can be applied to assessment or prediction of molecular properties. An emerging method for topography and slip plane analysis using energy frameworks, which are models of crystal packing that depict interaction energies as pillars or beams.

== See also ==
- Coordination polymers
- crystal nets (periodic graphs)
- Crystallography
- Laser-heated pedestal growth
- CrystEngComm
- Crystal Growth & Design
- CrystEngCommunity
- Hydrogen bond
- Molecular design software
- Supramolecular chemistry
- Self-assembly
- Molecular self-assembly
