= Action spectrum =

Graph of the rate of biological effectiveness plotted against wavelength of light

Absorbance spectra of free chlorophyll a (blue) and b (red) in a solvent. The action spectra of chlorophyll molecules are slightly modified in vivo depending on specific pigment-protein interactions.

An action spectrum is a graph of the rate of biological effectiveness plotted against wavelength of light. It is related to absorption spectrum in many systems. Mathematically, it describes the inverse quantity of light required to evoke a constant response. It is very rare for an action spectrum to describe the level of biological activity, since biological responses are often nonlinear with intensity.

Action spectra are typically written as unit-less responses with peak response of one, and it is also important to distinguish if an action spectrum refers to quanta at each wavelength (mol or log-photons), or to spectral power (W).

It shows which wavelength of light is most effectively used in a specific chemical reaction. Some reactants are able to use specific wavelengths of light more effectively to complete their reactions. For example, chlorophyll is much more efficient at using the red and blue regions than the green region of the light spectrum to carry out photosynthesis. Therefore, the action spectrum graph would show spikes above the wavelengths representing the colours red and blue.

The first action spectrum was made by T. W. Engelmann, who split light into its components by the prism and then illuminated Cladophora placed in a suspension of aerobic bacteria. He found that bacteria accumulated in the region of blue and red light of the split spectrum. He thus discovered the effect of the different wavelengths of light on photosynthesis and plotted the first action spectrum of photosynthesis.

Action spectra have a wide variety of uses in biological and chemical research, particularly in understanding the effect of ultraviolet (UV) light on biological molecules and systems. UV light wavelengths range between 295–400 nm and are known to induce skin and DNA damage. As a result, action spectra have been used to measure the efficiency of different light wavelengths in disinfecting water, the rate and mechanism of photodegradation of folic acid in the blood, and the chirality of molecules to determine secondary structure. Further examples include suppression of melatonin by wavelength and a variety of hazard functions, related to tissue damage from visible and near-visible light.

== See also ==
- Erythemal action spectrum
- Photosynthetically active radiation
- Photosynthesis
- Absorption spectrum
- Chlorophyll a
