= RSC Advances =

- Discipline: Chemistry
- Language: English
- Edited by: Russell Cox; Karen Faulds

Publication details
- History: 2011–present
- Publisher: Royal Society of Chemistry (United Kingdom)
- Frequency: Irregular (70+/year)
- Open access: Yes
- Impact factor: 6.1 (2025)

Standard abbreviations
- ISO 4: RSC Adv.

Indexing
- CODEN: RSCACL
- ISSN: 2046-2069
- OCLC no.: 778745168

Links
- Journal homepage; Online access

RSC Advances is an online-only peer-reviewed scientific journal covering research on all aspects of the chemical sciences. It was established in 2011 and is published by the Royal Society of Chemistry. The current editors-in-chief are Russell Cox (Leibniz Universität Hannover) and Karen Faulds (University of Strathclyde).

In 2014, the journal moved to a very high publication frequency, initially about 100/year (similar to that of ChemComm), but later in the year (and in 2015) turned to even higher frequency—however it did not become a continuous journal. The number of pages published annually had increased dramatically from about 26,500 in 2013 to over 65,000 in 2014, culminating at 116 issues and 115,000+ pages (~1000 pages per issue) in 2016.

In late 2016, it was announced that with effect from January 2017, the journal would convert from a subscription based journal to an open access journal. Meanwhile, the journal experienced a cool-down in publication volume, with each issue having only ~500 pages. There were 89 issues in 2017 and 74 issues in 2018.

== Abstracting and indexing ==
The journal is abstracted and indexed in the Science Citation Index Expanded, Current Contents/Physical, Chemical & Earth Sciences, and Scopus.
