= Journal of Materials Chemistry =

Weekly peer-reviewed scientific journal

- Discipline: Materials science
- Language: English
- Edited by: Liz Dunn

Publication details
- History: 1991–2012
- Publisher: Royal Society of Chemistry (United Kingdom)
- Frequency: Weekly
- Impact factor: 6.626 (2013)

Standard abbreviations
- ISO 4: J. Mater. Chem.

Indexing
- CODEN: JMACEP
- ISSN: 0959-9428 (print); 1364-5501 (web)
- OCLC no.: 23295112

Links
- Journal homepage

The Journal of Materials Chemistry was a weekly peer-reviewed scientific journal covering the applications, properties and synthesis of new materials. It was established in 1991 and published by the Royal Society of Chemistry. At the end of 2012 the journal was split into three independent journals: Journal of Materials Chemistry A (energy and sustainability), Journal of Materials Chemistry B (biology and medicine) and Journal of Materials Chemistry C (optical, magnetic and electronic devices). The editor-in-chief was Liz Dunn.

== See also ==
- List of scientific journals in chemistry
- Soft Matter
- Journal of Materials Chemistry A
- Journal of Materials Chemistry B
- Journal of Materials Chemistry C
