= CrystEngComm =

- Discipline: Chemistry, crystallography
- Language: English
- Edited by: Pierangelo Metrangolo

Publication details
- History: 1999–present
- Publisher: Royal Society of Chemistry (United Kingdom)
- Frequency: Biweekly
- Open access: Hybrid
- Impact factor: 3.756 (2021)

Standard abbreviations
- ISO 4: CrystEngComm

Indexing
- CODEN: CRECF4
- ISSN: 1466-8033
- OCLC no.: 42679031

Links
- Journal homepage

CrystEngComm is a peer-reviewed online-only scientific journal publishing original research and review articles on all aspects of crystal engineering including properties, polymorphism, target materials, and crystalline nanomaterials. It is published biweekly by the Royal Society of Chemistry and the editor-in-chief is Pierangelo Metrangolo. According to the Journal Citation Reports, the journal has a 2021 impact factor of 3.756. CrystEngComm has a close association with the virtual web community, CrystEngCommunity.

== History ==
CrystEngComm was one of the first online-only chemistry journals when it was established in 1999. Initially, articles were published online as soon as they were accepted and the journal did not publish articles in issues. However, in 2000 issues were introduced and the journal was published monthly. As submissions increased, the journal switched in 2011 to a biweekly publication. Authors can elect to have accepted articles published as open access.

The journal has been involved in the development of nomenclature for crystal engineering, which is gradually being adopted by researchers in the field.

== Article types ==
CrystEngComm publishes the following types of articles: Research Papers (original scientific work), Communications (original work that merits urgent publication), and Highlights (short reviews of topics from the field of crystal engineering).

== Citations ==
The five journals that cited CrystEngComm most often in 2009 are (in order of descending citation frequency) CrystEngComm, Crystal Growth & Design, Dalton Transactions, Acta Crystallographica Section E and Inorganic Chemistry. In 2009, the five journals that have been cited most frequently by articles published in CrystEngComm are Inorganic Chemistry, Journal of the American Chemical Society, Angewandte Chemie International Edition, Chemical Communications and Crystal Growth & Design.

According to Web of Science, the following three articles have been cited most often:

1. M Nishio (2004). "CH/pi hydrogen bonds in crystals". CrystEngComm. 6 (27): 130–158. Bibcode:2004CEG.....6..130N. doi:10.1039/B313104A.
2. SR Batten (2001). "Topology of interpenetration". CrystEngComm. 3 (18): 67–72. Bibcode:2001CEG.....3...67B. doi:10.1039/B102400K.
3. VA Blatov; L Carlucci; G Ciani; DM Proserpio (2004). "Interpenetrating metal-organic and inorganic 3D networks: a computer-aided systematic investigation. Part I. Analysis of the Cambridge structural database". CrystEngComm. 6 (65): 255–270. Bibcode:2004CEG.....6..377B. doi:10.1039/B409722J.
