= Gianluigi Botton =

French-Canadian researcher

- Born: 1963 (age 62–63)

Academic background
- Education: BEng, Physics, 1987, PhD, Materials Eng, 1992, Polytechnique Montréal
- Thesis: Caractérisation et mécanismes de croissance de la phase MgAl_{2}O_{4} dans les composites Al-Mg renforcés avec Al_{2}O_{3} (1994)
- Website: bottonsgroup.com

Gianluigi A. Botton FRSC (born 1963) is a French Canadian scientist and engineer. As a Canada Research Chair at McMaster University, he leads the Botton's Group to investigate new materials on the atomic-scale.

== Early life and education ==
Botton was born in 1963. He completed his Bachelor of Engineering degree in physics and PhD in materials engineering from Polytechnique Montréal. Following his PhD, Botton was a Postdoctoral Fellow at the University of Cambridge working under Colin Humphreys from 1993 to 1998. He then joined the Materials Technology Laboratory of Natural Resources Canada in 1998 as a research scientist. Through his post-graduate positions, Botton also earned a summer job studying electron microscopy at Simon Fraser University.

== Career ==
Botton joined the faculty of McMaster University's Department of Materials Science and Engineering in 2001. As a professor at McMaster, he also became the founder and inaugural director of the Canadian Centre for Electron Microscopy since 2008. Throughout his tenure at McMaster, he focused his research laboratory towards the understanding of the structure of different materials at the atomic level. As a result of his efforts, Botton was elected a fellow of the Microscopy Society of America and named a Tier 1 Canada Research Chair. By 2017, Botton was named the recipient of CMSC Metal Physics Award and McMaster's the Faculty of Engineering Research Achievement Award.

In 2018, Botton was elected a Fellow of the Royal Society of Canada for his significant contributions within his field. The following year, Botton was offered, and accepted, a directorship position with the Canadian Light Source (CLS) at the University of Saskatchewan "given his extensive background in materials science and advanced microscopy." In 2023, Button was appointed CEO of the Diamond Light Source.
