= Natural Product Reports =

- Discipline: Chemistry
- Language: English
- Edited by: Tobias Gulder

Publication details
- History: 1984-present
- Publisher: Royal Society of Chemistry (United Kingdom)
- Frequency: Monthly
- Impact factor: 15.111 (2021)

Standard abbreviations
- ISO 4: Nat. Prod. Rep.

Indexing
- CODEN: NPRRDF
- ISSN: 0265-0568 (print); 1460-4752 (web)
- LCCN: 93646083
- OCLC no.: 888499957

Links
- Journal homepage

Natural Product Reports is a monthly peer-reviewed scientific journal published by the Royal Society of Chemistry. It publishes reviews commissioned by the editorial board on all areas of natural products research. The editors-in-chief is Tobias Gulder (Technical University of Dresden).

== Abstracting and indexing ==
The journal is abstracted and indexed in CASSI, Science Citation Index, Current Contents/Physical, Chemical & Earth Sciences, Index Medicus/MEDLINE/PubMed, and Scopus. According to the Journal Citation Reports, the journal has a 2021 impact factor of 15.111.

== See also ==
- Organic & Biomolecular Chemistry
- MedChemComm
- List of scientific journals
- List of scientific journals in chemistry
