= Natural Product Updates =

- Discipline: Chemistry
- Language: English

Publication details
- History: 2002 to 2021
- Publisher: Royal Society of Chemistry (United Kingdom)

Standard abbreviations
- ISO 4: Nat. Prod. Updates

Indexing
- ISSN: 0950-1711

Links
- Journal homepage

Natural Product Updates (NPU) provides graphical abstracts of new developments in natural product chemistry, selected from dozens of key primary journals. Coverage includes:

Isolation studies
Biosynthesis
New natural products
Known compounds from new sources
Structure determinations
New properties and biological activities

Natural Product Updates is a fully searchable online, text and graphical database that is updated weekly with the latest developments in catalysis. It is also available as a monthly print bulletin.
