= Journal of Materials Chemistry B =

- Discipline: Materials science
- Language: English
- Edited by: Jessica Winter

Publication details
- History: 2013-present
- Publisher: Royal Society of Chemistry (United Kingdom)
- Frequency: Weekly
- Impact factor: 7.571 (2021)

Standard abbreviations
- ISO 4: J. Mater. Chem. B

Indexing
- CODEN: JMCBDV
- ISSN: 2050-7518
- OCLC no.: 874322778

Links
- Journal homepage

The Journal of Materials Chemistry B is a weekly peer-reviewed scientific journal covering the properties, applications, and synthesis of new materials related to biology and medicine. It is one of the three journals that were created after the Journal of Materials Chemistry was split at the end of 2012. The first issue was published in January 2013. It is published by the Royal Society of Chemistry. The other two parts of the Journal of Materials Chemistry family are Journal of Materials Chemistry A and Journal of Materials Chemistry C, which cover different materials science topics. The editor-in-chief for the Journal of Materials Chemistry family of journals is currently Nazario Martin. The current editor-in-chief for Journal of Materials Chemistry B is Jessica Winter.

== Abstracting and indexing ==
The journal is abstracted and indexed in the Science Citation Index.

== See also ==
- List of scientific journals in chemistry
- Journal of Materials Chemistry A
- Journal of Materials Chemistry C
- Soft Matter
- Biomaterials Science
