= MedChemComm =

- Discipline: Chemistry, medicine
- Language: English
- Edited by: Mike Waring

Publication details
- History: 2010–present
- Publisher: Royal Society of Chemistry (United Kingdom)
- Frequency: Monthly
- Open access: Hybrid
- Impact factor: 2.495 (2014)

Standard abbreviations
- ISO 4: MedChemComm

Indexing
- ISSN: 2040-2503 (print); 2040-2511 (web)
- LCCN: 2011243017
- OCLC no.: 663378788

Links
- Journal homepage

MedChemComm (in full: Medicinal Chemistry Communications) is a peer-reviewed scientific journal publishing original (primary) research and review articles on all aspects of medicinal chemistry, including drug discovery, pharmacology and pharmaceutical chemistry. Until December 2019, it was published monthly by the Royal Society of Chemistry in partnership with the European Federation for Medicinal Chemistry, of which it was the official journal. Authors can elect to have accepted articles published as open access. According to the Journal Citation Reports, the journal has a 2014 impact factor of 2.495, ranking it 27th out of 59 journals in the category "Chemistry, Medicinal" and 163 out of 289 journals in the category "Biochemistry & Molecular Biology".

The editor-in-chief is Mike Waring (Newcastle University).

As of January 1, 2020 - the journal is now called RSC Medicinal Chemistry and continues to be published monthly under this new name.

== Article types ==
MedChemComm publishes Research Articles (original scientific work, usually between 4-10 pages in length) and Reviews (critical analyses of specialist areas).
