= Journal of Materials Chemistry C =

- Discipline: Materials science
- Language: English
- Edited by: Natalie Stingelin

Publication details
- History: 2013-present
- Publisher: Royal Society of Chemistry (United Kingdom)
- Frequency: Weekly
- Impact factor: 8.067 (2021)

Standard abbreviations
- ISO 4: J. Mater. Chem. C

Indexing
- CODEN: JMCCCX
- ISSN: 2050-7534
- OCLC no.: 822737033

Links
- Journal homepage

The Journal of Materials Chemistry C is a weekly peer-reviewed scientific journal covering the properties, applications, and synthesis of new materials related to optical, magnetic and electronic devices. It is one of the three journals created from the splitting of Journal of Materials Chemistry at the end of 2012. Its first issue was published in January 2013. The journal is published by the Royal Society of Chemistry and has two sister journals, Journal of Materials Chemistry A and Journal of Materials Chemistry B. The editor-in-chief for the Journal of Materials Chemistry family of journals is currently Nazario Martin. The deputy editor-in-chief for Journal of Materials Chemistry C is Natalie Stingelin.

== Abstracting and indexing ==
The journal is abstracted and indexed in the Science Citation Index.

== See also ==
- List of scientific journals in chemistry
- Materials Horizons
- Journal of Materials Chemistry A
- Journal of Materials Chemistry B
