= Chemical Society Reviews =

- Discipline: Chemistry
- Language: English
- Edited by: Jennifer Love

Publication details
- Former names: Quarterly Reviews, Chemical Society; Royal Institute of Chemistry, Reviews
- History: 1972-present
- Publisher: Royal Society of Chemistry (United Kingdom)
- Frequency: Biweekly
- Impact factor: 39.0 (2024)

Standard abbreviations
- ISO 4: Chem. Soc. Rev.

Indexing
- CODEN: CSRVBR
- ISSN: 0306-0012 (print); 1460-4744 (web)
- LCCN: 73640983
- OCLC no.: 191709218

Links
- Journal homepage; Online access

Chemical Society Reviews is a biweekly peer-reviewed scientific journal published by the Royal Society of Chemistry, for review articles on topics of current interest in chemistry. Its predecessors were Quarterly Reviews, Chemical Society (1947–1971) and Royal Institute of Chemistry, Reviews (1968–1971); it maintained its current title since 1972. According to the Journal Citation Reports, the journal has a 2024 impact factor of 39.0. The current editor-in-chief (chair of editorial board) is Jennifer Love (University of Calgary).

Chemical Society Reviews publishes occasional themed issues on new and emerging areas of research in the chemical sciences. These issues are edited by a guest editor who is a specialist in their field. Since 2005, Chemical Society Reviews has published reviews on topics of broad appeal, termed "social interest" reviews, such as articles on art conservation, forensics, and automotive fuels.

The journal is abstracted and indexed in PubMed/MEDLINE, Scopus, and UGC.

== Journal Rankings ==
The table below provides an overview of recent bibliometric ranking indicators for Chemical Society Reviews:

Bibliometric rankings for Chemical Society Reviews (2023)
Source	Category	Rank	Percentile	Quartile
Scopus	General chemistry (Chemistry)	2/408	99.51	Q1
IF (Web of Science)	Chemistry, multidisciplinary	2/230	99.30	Q1
JCI (Web of Science)	Chemistry, multidisciplinary	5/231	97.84	Q1

== Article types ==
Chemical Society Reviews publishes "Tutorial reviews" and "Critical reviews". The former are written to be of relevance both to the general research chemist who is new to the field, as well as the expert, whereas the latter aim to provide a deeper understanding of the topic in hand, but retain their accessibility through an introduction written for the general reader.

== See also ==
- Journal of the Chemical Society
- Proceedings of the Chemical Society
