= New Journal of Chemistry =

- Discipline: Chemistry
- Language: English
- Edited by: Jean-François Gérard

Publication details
- Former name: Nouveau Journal de Chimie
- History: 1977–present
- Publisher: Royal Society of Chemistry on behalf of the French National Centre for Scientific Research
- Frequency: Monthly
- Impact factor: 3.3 (2022)

Standard abbreviations
- ISO 4: New J. Chem.

Indexing
- CODEN: NJCHE5
- ISSN: 1144-0546 (print); 1369-9261 (web)
- OCLC no.: 39927704

Links
- Journal homepage

The New Journal of Chemistry is a monthly peer-reviewed scientific journal publishing research and review articles on all aspects of chemistry. It is published by the Royal Society of Chemistry on behalf of the French National Centre for Scientific Research (CNRS). It was established as Nouveau Journal de Chimie in 1977, acquiring its current title in 1999. The current editors-in-chief is Jean-François Gérard (INSA Lyon). According to the Journal Citation Reports, the journal has a 2020 impact factor of 3.591.

== Article types ==
- Full papers: which contain original scientific work that has not been published previously
- Communications: original scientific work that justifies rapid publication
- Perspectives: short review articles, by invitation only
- Comments: for discussion of scientific opinions concerning published material

== See also ==
- List of scientific journals in chemistry
