= Crystal Growth & Design =

- Discipline: Chemistry, crystallography
- Language: English
- Edited by: Jonathan W. Steed

Publication details
- History: 2001-present
- Publisher: American Chemical Society (United States)
- Frequency: Monthly
- Impact factor: 3.8 (2022)

Standard abbreviations
- ISO 4: Cryst. Growth Des.

Indexing
- CODEN: CGDEFU
- ISSN: 1528-7483 (print); 1528-7505 (web)
- LCCN: 00211604
- OCLC no.: 43515752

Links
- Journal homepage

Crystal Growth & Design is a monthly peer-reviewed scientific journal published by the American Chemical Society. It was established in January 2001 as a bimonthly journal and changed to a monthly frequency in 2006. The editor-in-chief is Jonathan W. Steed from Durham University.

== Aims and scope ==
The focus of the journal is theory and experimentation pertaining to the design, growth, and application of crystalline materials. Processes involved in achieving the various stages of development are also covered. Included in this focus is the physical, chemical, and biological properties of these materials, and how these impact the process. Fundamental research, which contributes to these areas, is also part of the scope of this journal. The intended audience is scientists and engineers working in the fields of crystal growth, crystal engineering, and the industrial application of crystalline materials.

== Abstracting and indexing ==
The journal is indexed in Science Citation Index, Current Contents/Physical, Chemical & Earth Sciences, Scopus, EBSCOhost, and Chemical Abstracts Service/CASSI.

== Most cited articles ==
The most cited recent articles are:

- Desiraju, Gautam R. (2008). "Polymorphism: the Same and Not Quite the Same". Crystal Growth & Design. 8: 3–5. doi:10.1021/cg701000q.
- Schultheiss, Nate; Newman, Ann (2009). "Pharmaceutical Cocrystals and Their Physicochemical Properties". Crystal Growth & Design. 9 (6): 2950–2967. doi:10.1021/cg900129f. PMC 2690398. PMID 19503732.
- Good, David J.; Rodriguez-Hornedo, Naír (2009). "Solubility Advantage of Pharmaceutical Cocrystals". Crystal Growth & Design. 9 (5): 2252. doi:10.1021/cg801039j.
