= ChemComm =

- Discipline: Chemistry
- Language: English
- Edited by: Douglas Stephan

Publication details
- Former names: Journal of the Chemical Society D: Chemical Communications; Journal of the Chemical Society, Chemical Communications
- History: 1969-present (1996-present, under current name)
- Publisher: Royal Society of Chemistry (United Kingdom)
- Frequency: 100/year
- Impact factor: 4.3 (2025)

Standard abbreviations
- ISO 4: Chem. Commun.

Indexing
- CODEN: CHCOFS
- ISSN: 1359-7345 (print); 1364-548X (web)
- LCCN: 96660034
- OCLC no.: 869930135

Links
- Journal homepage

ChemComm (or Chemical Communications), formerly known as Journal of the Chemical Society D: Chemical Communications (1969–1971), Journal of the Chemical Society, Chemical Communications (1972–1995), is a peer-reviewed scientific journal published by the Royal Society of Chemistry. It covers all aspects of chemistry. In January 2012, the journal moved to publishing 100 issues per year. The current chair of the editorial board is Douglas Stephan (University of Toronto, Canada), while the executive editor is Richard Kelly.

== Abstracting and indexing ==
The journal is abstracted and indexed in:

- Chemical Abstracts
- Science Citation Index
- Current Contents/Physical, Chemical & Earth Sciences
- Scopus
- Index Medicus/MEDLINE/PubMed

According to the Journal Citation Reports, the journal has a 2025 impact factor of 4.3.

== See also ==
- New Journal of Chemistry
- Chemical Society Reviews
- Chemical Science
- RSC Advances
