= Soft Matter (journal) =

- Discipline: Materials science
- Language: English
- Edited by: Alfred Crosby

Publication details
- History: 2005–present
- Publisher: Royal Society of Chemistry (United Kingdom)
- Frequency: Weekly
- Impact factor: 3.4 (2022)

Standard abbreviations
- ISO 4: Soft Matter

Indexing
- CODEN: SMOABF
- ISSN: 1744-683X (print); 1744-6848 (web)
- LCCN: 2005252381
- OCLC no.: 60579554

Links
- Journal homepage; Online archive

Soft Matter is a peer-reviewed scientific journal covering the science of soft matter. It is published by the Royal Society of Chemistry and the editor-in-chief is Alfred J. Crosby (University of Massachusetts, Amherst, USA).

The journal was established in 2005. Initially it was published monthly, but as submissions increased it switched to 24 issues a year in 2009 and to 48 issues a year in 2012.

== Abstracting and indexing ==
The journal is abstracted and indexed in:

- Current Contents/Physical, Chemical & Earth Sciences
- Index Medicus/MEDLINE/PubMed
- Science Citation Index
- Scopus

According to the Journal Citation Reports, the journal has a 2021 impact factor of 4.046.

== See also ==
- List of scientific journals in chemistry
