= List of chemistry journals =

This is a list of scientific journals in chemistry and its various subfields. For journals mainly about materials science, see List of materials science journals.

== A ==
- Accounts of Chemical Research
- ACS Catalysis
- ACS Sustainable Chemistry and Engineering
- Acta Chemica Scandinavica
- Acta Chimica Slovenica
- Advanced Functional Materials
- Aldrichimica Acta
- The Analyst
- Analytica Chimica Acta
- Analytical and Bioanalytical Chemistry
- Analytical Chemistry
- Analytical Methods
- Angewandte Chemie International Edition
- Annual Reports Section A
- Annual Reports Section B
- Annual Reports Section C
- Annual Review of Analytical Chemistry
- Annual Review of Biochemistry
- Annual Review of Physical Chemistry
- Applied Catalysis A: General
- Applied Organometallic Chemistry
- Applied Nanoscience
- Applied Spectroscopy Reviews
- Arkivoc (Archive for Organic Chemistry)
- Australian Journal of Chemistry
- Australian Journal of Education in Chemistry

== B ==
- Beilstein Journal of Organic Chemistry
- Biochemical Journal
- Bioconjugate Chemistry
- Biomacromolecules
- Biomedical Chromatography
- Bioorganic & Medicinal Chemistry
- Bioorganic & Medicinal Chemistry Letters
- Bulletin of the Chemical Society of Japan

== C ==
- Canadian Journal of Chemistry
- Catalysis Science & Technology
- Catalysts and Catalysed Reactions
- Central European Journal of Chemistry
- ChemBioChem
- ChemCatChem
- Chemical Communications
- Chemical Physics Letters
- Chemical Reviews
- Chemical Science
- Chemical Society Reviews
- Chemische Berichte
- Chemistry Education Research and Practice
- Chemistry: A European Journal
- Chemistry Letters
- Chemistry of Materials
- ChemistrySelect
- ChemSusChem
- ChemMedChem
- Chemometrics and Intelligent Laboratory Systems
- Chemosphere
- ChemPhysChem
- ChemPlusChem
- Chimica Oggi - Chemistry Today
- Chemik Polski
- Collection of Czechoslovak Chemical Communications
- Communications Chemistry
- CrystEngComm

== D ==
- Dalton Transactions

== E ==
- Education in Chemistry
- Energy and Environmental Science
- Energy & Fuels
- Environmental Chemistry
- European Journal of Inorganic Chemistry
- European Journal of Medicinal Chemistry
- European Journal of Organic Chemistry

== F ==
- Faraday Discussions
- Faraday Transactions

== G ==
- Geostandards and Geoanalytical Research
- Green Chemistry

== H ==
- Helvetica Chimica Acta

== I ==
- Inorganic Chemistry
- International Journal of Hydrogen Energy
- International Journal of Quantum Chemistry
- Ion Exchange Letters

== J ==
- JAAS Journal of Analytical Atomic Spectrometry
- Jahres-Bericht über die Leistungen der chemischen Technologie
- Journal of Agricultural and Food Chemistry
- Journal of the American Chemical Society
- Journal of Applied Polymer Science
- Journal of Biological Chemistry
- Journal of Biological Inorganic Chemistry
- Journal of the Brazilian Chemical Society
- Journal of Catalysis
- Journal of Cellular Plastics
- Journal of Chemical Education
- Journal of Chemical Information and Modeling
- Journal of Chemical Physics
- Journal of Chemical Sciences
- Journal of the Chemical Society
- Journal of the Chemical Society of Pakistan
- Journal of Chemical Thermodynamics
- Journal of Cheminformatics
- Journal of Chemometrics
- Journal of Chromatographic Science
- Journal of Chromatography A
- Journal of Cluster Science
- Journal of Combinatorial Chemistry
- Journal of Computational Chemistry
- Journal of Elastomers and Plastics
- Journal of Electroanalytical Chemistry
- Journal of Environmental Monitoring
- Journal of Experimental Nanoscience
- Journal of Heterocyclic Chemistry
- Journal of Mass Spectrometry
- Journal of Materials Chemistry
- Journal of Medicinal Chemistry
- Journal of Molecular Structure
- Journal of Molecular Structure: THEOCHEM
- Journal of Natural Products
- Journal of Organic Chemistry
- Journal of Organometallic Chemistry
- Journal of Physical Chemistry A
- Journal of Physical Chemistry B
- Journal of Physical Chemistry C
- Journal of Physical Chemistry Letters
- Journal of Polymer Science Part A: Polymer Chemistry
- Journal of Polymer Science Part B: Polymer Physics
- Journal of Radioanalytical and Nuclear Chemistry
- Journal of Separation Science
- Journal of the Royal Institute of Chemistry
- Journal of the Electrochemical Society
- Journal of Thermal Analysis and Calorimetry

== L ==
- Lab on a Chip
- Langmuir
- Liebigs Annalen

== M ==
- Macromolecules
- Magnetic Resonance in Chemistry
- MedChemComm
- Metallomics
- Methods in Organic Synthesis
- Microchimica Acta
- Molbank
- Molecular BioSystems
- Molecular Diversity
- Molecular Physics
- Molecules

== N ==
- Nano Letters
- Natural Product Reports
- Nature Chemical Biology
- Nature Chemistry
- Nature Materials
- Nature Protocols
- New Journal of Chemistry

== O ==
- Open Chemistry
- Organic and Biomolecular Chemistry
- Organic Letters
- Organometallics

== P ==
- PeerJ Analytical Chemistry
- PeerJ Inorganic Chemistry
- PeerJ Materials Science
- PeerJ Organic Chemistry
- PeerJ Physical Chemistry
- Perkin Transactions
- Photochemical and Photobiological Sciences
- Physical Chemistry Chemical Physics
- Polish Journal of Chemistry
- Polyhedron
- Proceedings of the Chemical Society

== R ==
- RSC Advances
- Revista Boliviana de Quimica
- Revista de la Sociedad Venezolana Química

== S ==
- Scientia Pharmaceutica
- Soft Matter
- Spectroscopy Letters
- Surface Science Reports
- Synlett
- Synthesis
- Science China Chemistry

== T ==
- Talanta
- Tetrahedron
- Tetrahedron Letters
- Theoretical Chemistry Accounts
- Trends in Analytical Chemistry
- Turkish Journal of Chemistry

== Z ==
- Zeitschrift für Naturforschung
- Zeitschrift für Naturforschung B
- Zeitschrift für Physikalische Chemie

== See also ==
- Lists of academic journals
- List of scientific journals
- List of computational chemistry software
- Scientific journal
- Scientific literature
