= Physical Chemistry Chemical Physics =

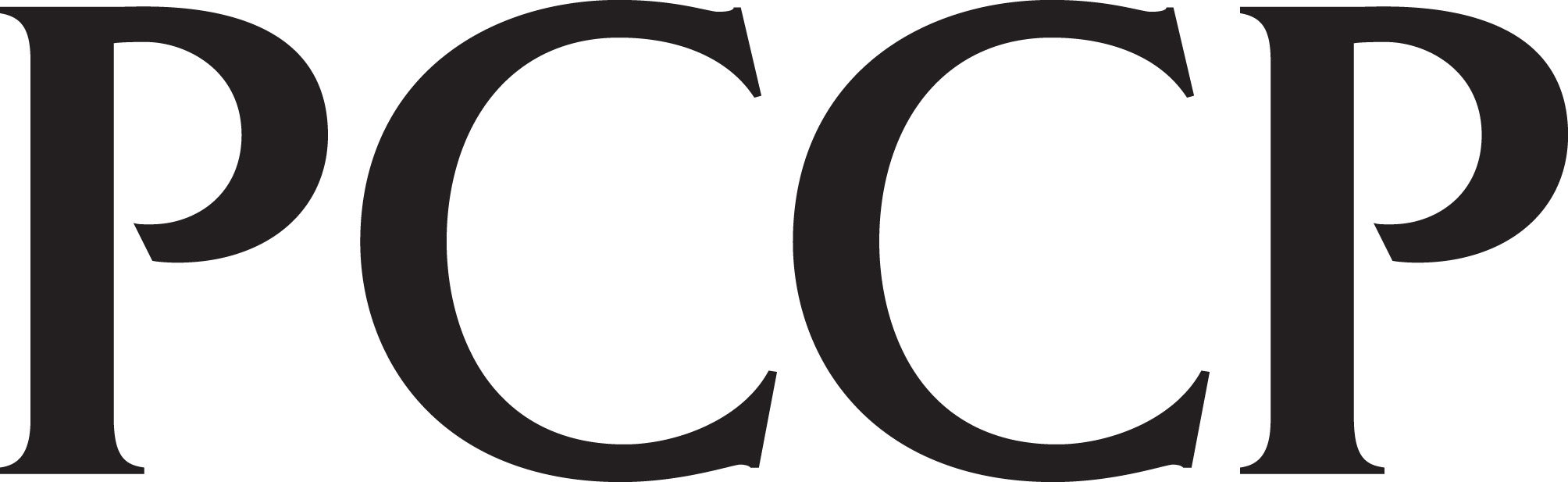
- Discipline: Physical chemistry, chemical physics, biophysical chemistry
- Language: English
- Edited by: Anouk Rijs

Publication details
- History: 1999-present
- Publisher: Royal Society of Chemistry (United Kingdom)
- Frequency: Weekly
- Impact factor: 2.9 (2023)

Standard abbreviations
- ISO 4: Phys. Chem. Chem. Phys.

Indexing
- CODEN: PPCPFQ
- ISSN: 1463-9076 (print); 1463-9084 (web)
- LCCN: sn99047155
- OCLC no.: 807667458

Links
- Journal homepage

Physical Chemistry Chemical Physics is a weekly peer-reviewed scientific journal publishing research and review articles on any aspect of physical chemistry, chemical physics, and biophysical chemistry. It is published by the Royal Society of Chemistry on behalf of eighteen participating societies. The editor-in-chief is Anouk Rijs, (Vrije Universiteit Amsterdam).

The journal was established in 1999 as the results of a merger between Faraday Transactions and a number of other physical chemistry journals published by different societies.

== Owner societies ==
The journal is run by an Ownership Board, on which all the member societies have equal representation. The eighteen participating societies are:

- Canadian Society for Chemistry
- Deutsche Bunsen-Gesellschaft für Physikalische Chemie (Germany)
- Institute of Chemistry of Ireland
- Israel Chemical Society
- Kemian Seurat (Finland)
- Kemisk Forening (Denmark)
- Koninklijke Nederlandse Chemische Vereniging (Netherlands)
- Korean Chemical Society
- New Zealand Institute of Chemistry
- Norsk Kjemisk Selskap (Norway)
- Polskie Towarzystwo Chemiczne (Poland)
- Real Sociedad Española de Química (Spain)
- Royal Australian Chemical Institute
- Royal Society of Chemistry (United Kingdom)
- Società Chimica Italiana (Italy)
- Svenska Kemisamfundet (Sweden)
- Swiss Chemical Society
- Türkiye Kimya Dernegi (Turkey)

== Article types ==
The journal publishes the following types of articles

- Research Papers, original scientific work that has not been published previously
- Communications, original scientific work that has not been published previously and is of an urgent nature
- Perspectives, review articles of interest to a broad readership which are commissioned by the editorial board
- Comments, a medium for the discussion and exchange of scientific opinions, normally concerning material previously published in the journal

== Abstracting and indexing ==
The journal is abstracted and indexed in:

- Aquatic Sciences & Fisheries Abstracts
- Chemical Abstracts
- Chemical Engineering and Biotechnology Abstracts
- ChemInform
- Chemistry Citation Index
- Computer and Information Systems Abstracts Journal
- Current Contents
- Electronics and Communications Abstracts Journal
- Engineering Index Monthly
- Index Medicus/MEDLINE
- Inspec
- Mass Spectrometry Bulletin
- Mechanical Engineering Abstracts
- Process and Chemical Engineering
- Reaction Citation Index
- Referativnyi Zhurnal
- Science Citation Index

According to the Journal Citation Reports, the journal has a 2021 impact factor of 3.945.

== See also ==
- List of scientific journals in chemistry
- Annual Reports on the Progress of Chemistry Section C
