= Journal of the Chemical Society =

- Discipline: Chemistry
- Language: English

Publication details
- History: 1849–1996
- Publisher: Chemical Society (United Kingdom)

Standard abbreviations
- ISO 4: J. Chem. Soc.

Links
- Journal homepage

The Journal of the Chemical Society was a scientific journal established by the Chemical Society in 1849 as the Quarterly Journal of the Chemical Society. The first editor was Edmund Ronalds. The journal underwent several renamings, splits, and mergers throughout its history. In 1980, the Chemical Society merged with several other organizations into the Royal Society of Chemistry. The journal's continuity is found in Chemical Communications, Dalton Transactions, Faraday Transactions, and Perkin Transactions, all of which are published by the Royal Society of Chemistry.

== History ==
Proceedings of the Chemical Society

- Memoirs of the Chemical Society of London (1841)
- Proceedings of the Chemical Society of London (1842–1843)
- Memoirs and Proceedings of the Chemical Society (1843–1848)
- Proceedings of the Chemical Society, London (1885–1914)
- Published as a supplement to Journal of the Chemical Society from 1914 to 1956
- Proceedings of the Chemical Society (1957–1964)

Journal of the Chemical Society

From 1849 to 1965

- Quarterly Journal of the Chemical Society (1849–1862)
- Journal of the Chemical Society (1862–1877)
- Journal of the Chemical Society, Abstracts (1878–1925)
- Journal of the Chemical Society, Transactions (1878–1925)
- Journal of the Chemical Society (1926–1965)

From 1966 to 1971

- Journal of the Chemical Society A: Inorganic, Physical, Theoretical (1966–1971)
- Journal of the Chemical Society B: Physical Organic (1966–1971)
- Journal of the Chemical Society C: Organic (1966–1971)
- Journal of the Chemical Society D: Chemical Communications (1969–1971)

From 1972 until 1996

- Journal of the Chemical Society, Dalton Transactions (1972–1996) (formerly J. Chem. Soc. A)
- Journal of the Chemical Society, Faraday Transactions (1972–1989) (formerly J. Chem. Soc. B)
- Journal of the Chemical Society, Perkin Transactions (1972–1996) (formerly J. Chem. Soc. C)
- Journal of the Chemical Society, Chemical Communications (1972–1995) (formerly J. Chem. Soc. D)

Jubilee of the Chemical Society

- Jubilee of the Chemical Society (1891)

Journal of the Royal Institute of Chemistry

- Proceedings of the Institute of Chemistry of Great Britain and Ireland (1877–1919)
- Journal and Proceedings of the Institute of Chemistry of Great Britain and Ireland (1920–1943)
- Journal and Proceedings of the Royal Institute of Chemistry of Great Britain and Ireland (1944–1948)
- Journal and Proceedings of the Royal Institute of Chemistry (1949)
- Journal of the Royal Institute of Chemistry (1950–1964)

== See also ==
- Chemical Society Reviews
- List of chemistry journals
