= List of artworks in the collection of the Royal Society of Chemistry =

The Royal Society of Chemistry (RSC) owns a number of significant artworks in its venue at Burlington House in London. The collection is composed of busts, paintings and other artefacts that were mainly acquired between the mid-19th and early 21st centuries (the Chemical Society was founded in 1841 and merged with others to become the RSC in 1980). Most of the acquisitions were donations from past members and staff, although a few were purchased directly by the Society.

== Humphry Davy bust ==
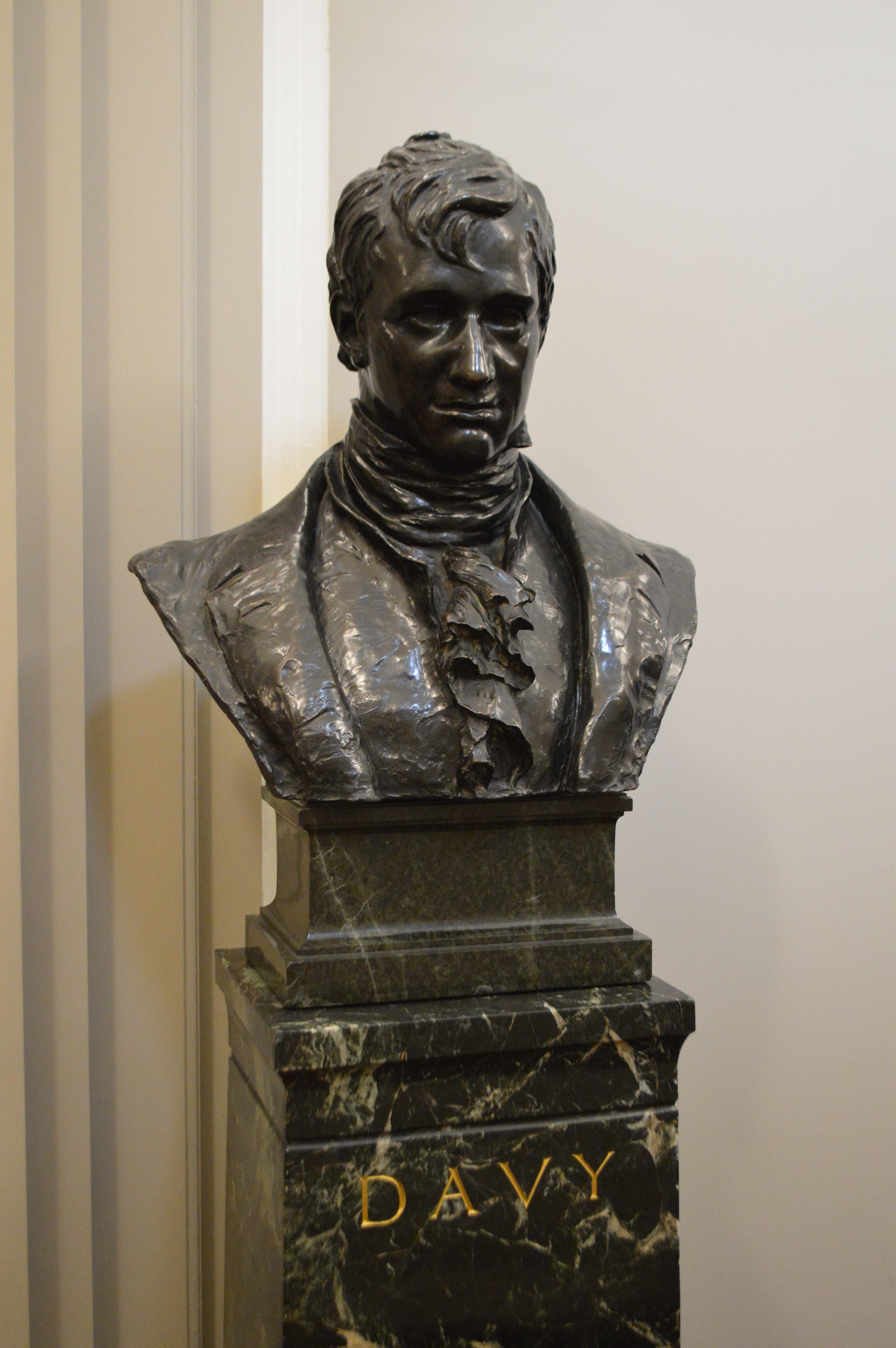
Humphry Davy bust – Burlington House

The bronze bust of Sir Humphry Davy was created by Ruby Levick and is a reproduction of an earlier sculpture by Miss Moore, donated to the Chemical Society by Rudolph Messell in 1900. At the Annual General Meeting of the Chemical Society of 29 March, Sir Thomas Edward Thorpe (President of the Society), reported on the gift of this work:

We are indebted to several of our Fellows for additions to the artistic possessions of the Society. Dr. Debus has presented us with a striking bust of Sir Humphry Davy, a cast of one modelled during his lifetime by Miss Moore. In accordance with the donor’s wishes, this bust now appears in our Meeting Room. On the recommendation of Mr. Thomas Armstrong, C.B., formerly the Art Director of the Science and Art Department, who was much impressed with the artistic quality of Miss Moore’s work, this bust has been copied by Miss Levick, with certain adaptations taken from Sir Thomas Lawrence’s well-known portrait in the possession of the Royal Society, and has been reproduced in bronze. The reproduction, together with its pedestal, has been given by our colleague, Dr. Messel.

Sir Humphry Davy is best remembered today for his discoveries of several alkali and alkaline earth metals, as well as contributions to the discoveries of the elemental nature of chlorine and iodine.

Ruby Levick was a Welsh sculptor and medallist who had many of her works exhibited at the Royal Academy.

== John Dalton bust ==
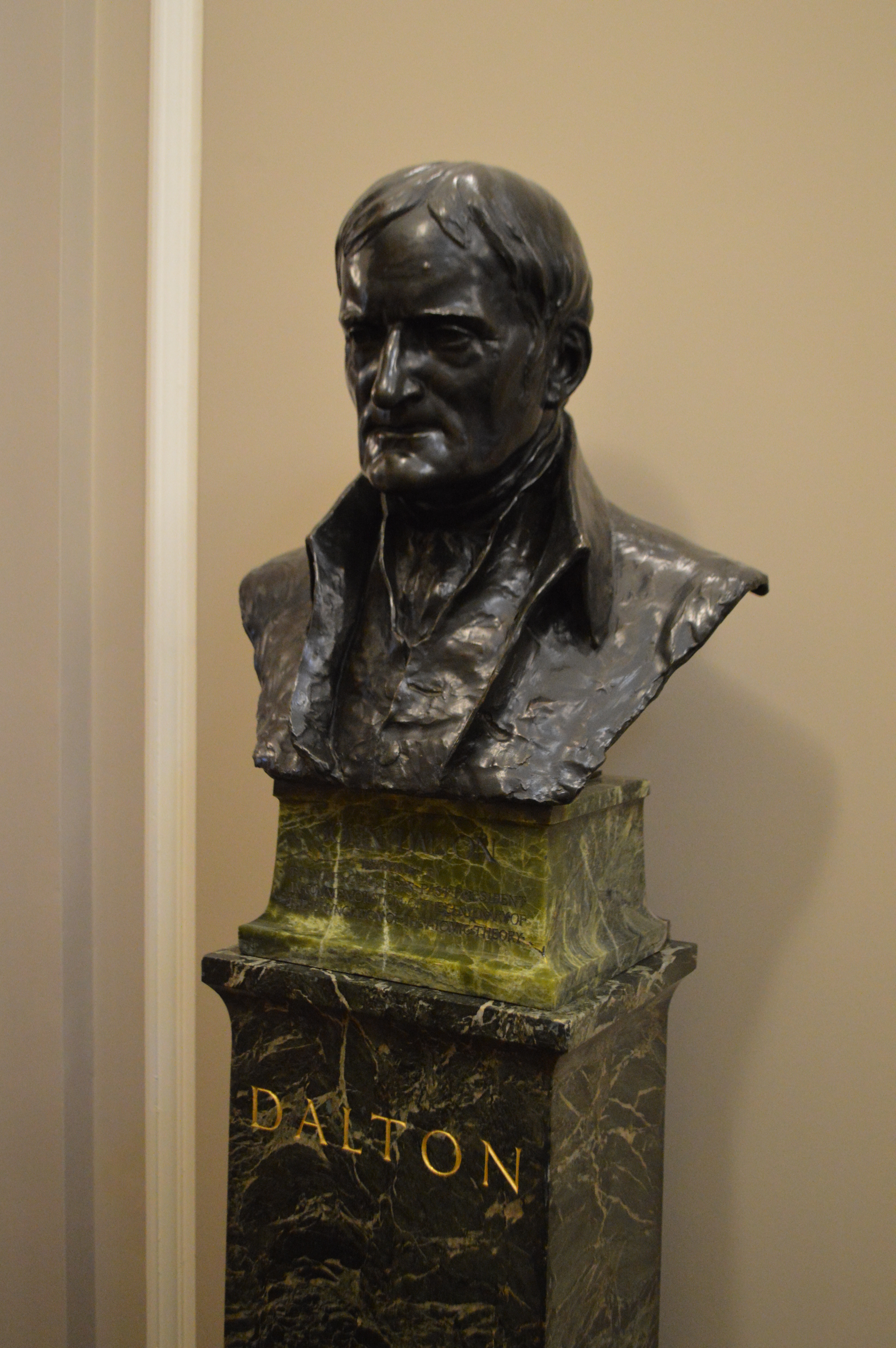
John Dalton bust – Burlington House

The bronze bust of John Dalton was also created by Ruby Levick and was donated to the Chemical Society in 1903 by its former President Sir Thomas Edward Thorpe, as also attested by the inscription engraved on the bust's base: "John Dalton presented by T.E. Thorpe CB. L.L.D. F.R.S. past President in commemoration of the centenary of the enunciation of the atomic theory".

A copy of his accompanying letter was printed in the Proceedings of the Chemical Society in 1903 and read out by President William A. Tilden:

The bronze is the work of Miss Levick, who is already favourably known to the Society by her reproduction of the bust of Davy in their possession. Of the artistic merits of her present work others must be the judge, but I may be permitted here to express my indebtedness to her for the skill and conscientious care with which she has striven to make a faithful and adequate presentment of the grand old philosopher.

John Dalton was an English chemist best known for his development of atomic theory.

== Michael Faraday bust ==
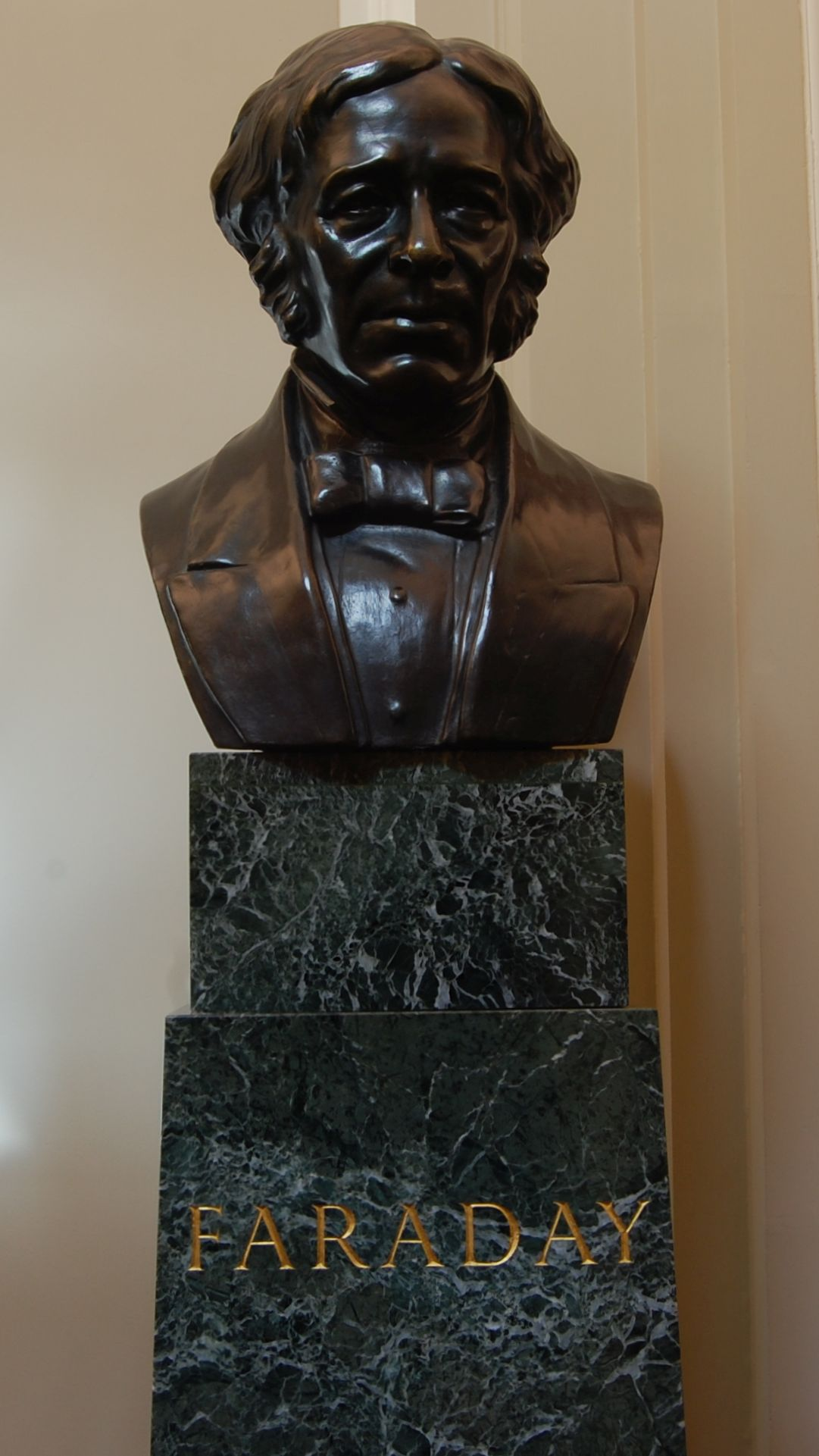
Michael Faraday bust – Burlington House

A bronze bust representing Michael Faraday, English scientist whose studies greatly contributed to the fields of electromagnetism and electrochemistry. The bust was presented to the Chemical Society by James Emerson Reynolds (1844–1920), president of the Chemical Society from 1901 to 1903:

Thursday, November 19th, 1908, at 8.30 p.m., Sir William Ramsay, K.C.B., F.R.S., President, in the Chair. The President announced that the Society had become indebted to J. Emerson Reynolds, F.R.S., for presenting a bust of Michael Faraday.

== William Henry Perkin bust ==
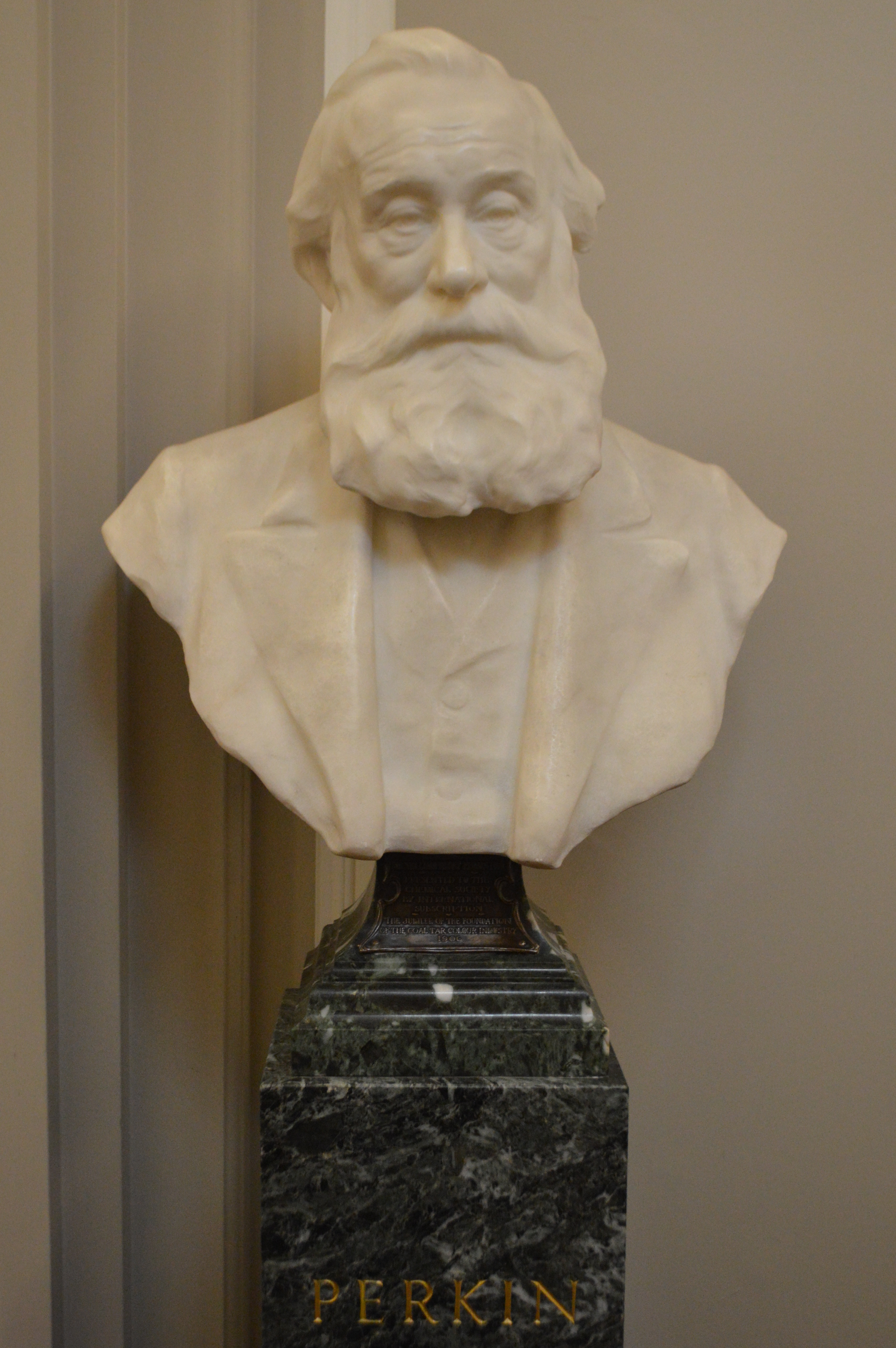
William Henry Perkin bust – Burlington House

The marble bust representing Sir William Henry Perkin was presented to the Chemical Society in 1907 by a committee administering the fund subscribed in support of the international celebration for the fiftieth anniversary of the foundation of the Coal Tar Colour Industry. At the Annual General Meeting of the Society, President Raphael Meldola reported on this gift:

On the occasion of the International Celebration marking the Fiftieth Anniversary of the Foundation of the Coal Tar Colour Industry, an address of congratulation to Sir William Henry Perkin, F.R.S., was presented on behalf of the Society by the President. In accordance with the resolution of the public meeting at which the commemoration was inaugurated, a marble bust of Sir William Perkin, executed by Mr. F. W. Pomeroy, A.K.A., has been presented to the Society by the Committee administering the Fund subscribed in support of the celebration.

Perkin's fame is mainly related to his discovery of mauveine.

The artist, Frederick William Pomeroy, was a British sculptor mainly prolific in ideal work and portrait busts, but also creator of public monuments.

== Henry Roscoe bust ==
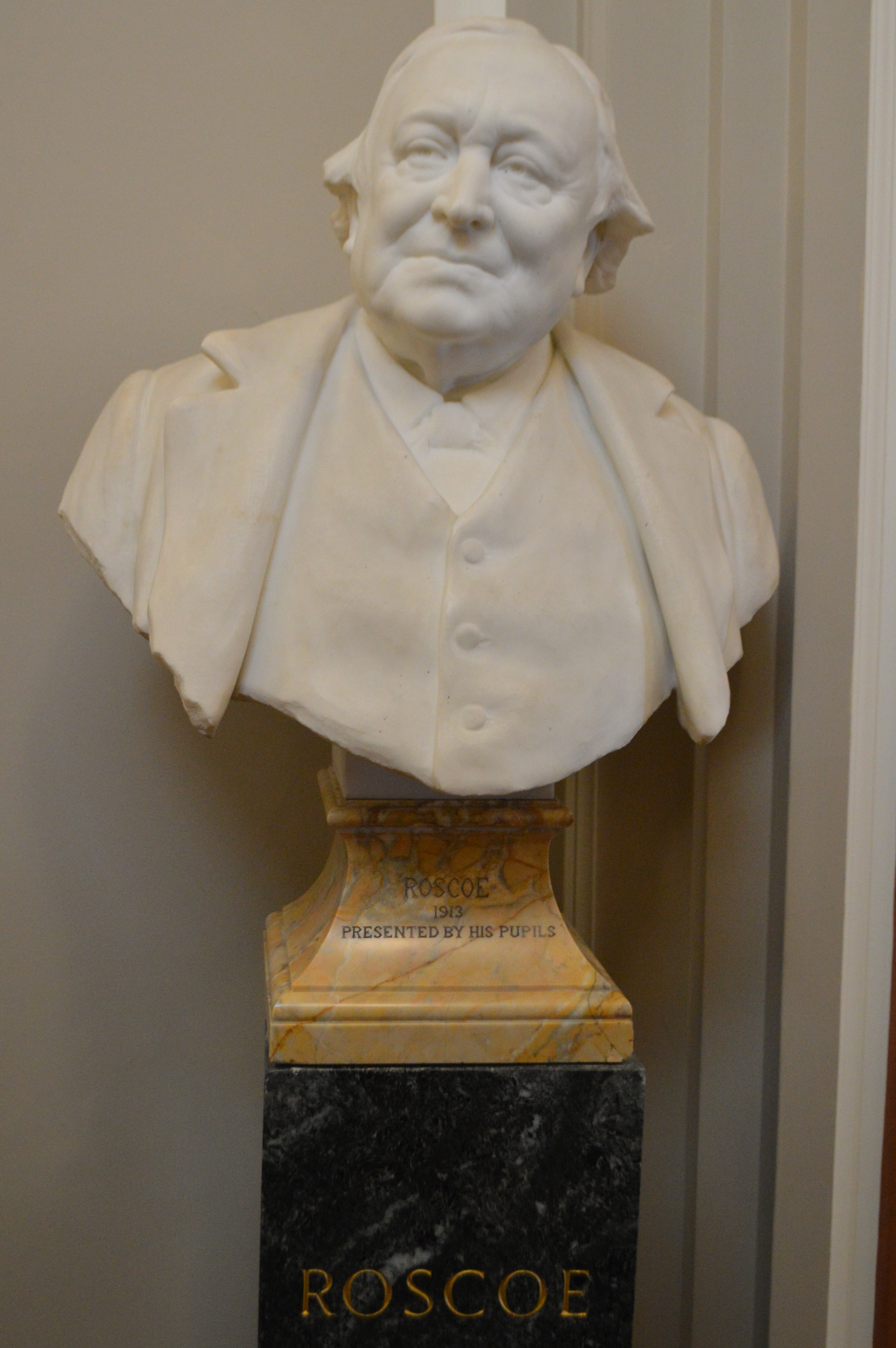
Henry Roscoe bust – Burlington House

The marble bust representing Sir Henry Enfield Roscoe by Alfred Drury was donated to the Chemical Society Library on 20 November 1913, on the occasion of Roscoe's eightieth birthday by his friends and pupils, as also attested by the inscription on its base:

Roscoe 1913 presented by his pupils

. In 1914 Professor William Perkin Jr., president of the society, reported on the gift of this artefact:

It is with very great pleasure that the Council have to report that a bust of the Right Honourable Sir Henry Enfield Roscoe, by Mr. Alfred Drury, R.A., has been presented to the Society by the friends and former students of Sir Henry Roscoe. The presentation was made before a distinguished company in the Rooms of the Society on November 20th, and the bust now adorns the Library.

President of the Chemical Society between 1880 and 1882, Roscoe was student as well as friend of the German chemist Robert Bunsen: in their researches laid the foundation of comparative photochemistry.

English architectural sculptor, Drury was elected Academician of the Royal Academy of Arts in 1913. He studied at the Oxford National Art Training School and in Paris.

== Justus von Liebig bust ==
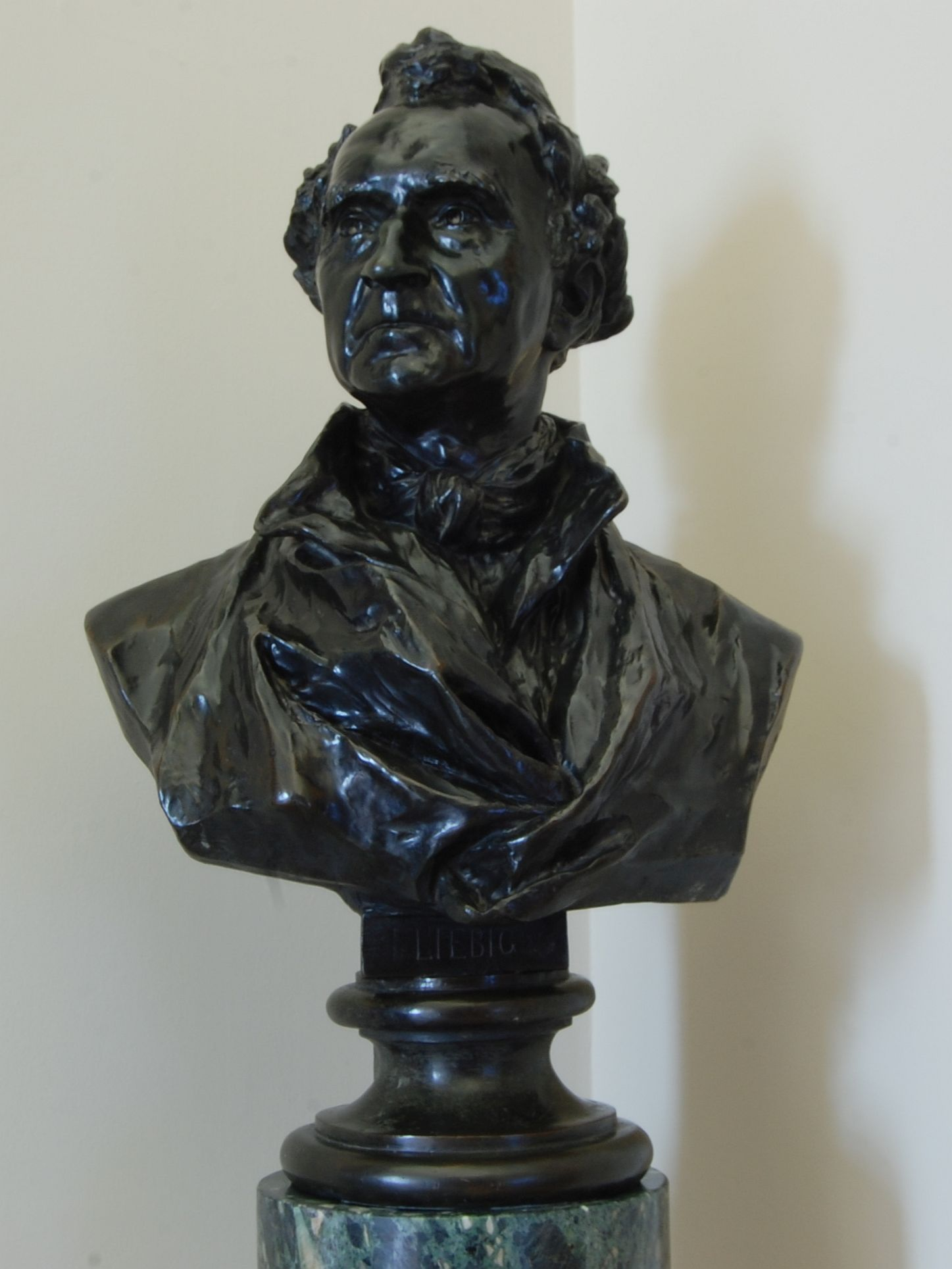
Justus von Liebig bust – Burlington House

The bronze bust representing Baron Justus von Liebig was presented to the Chemical Society by Rudolph Messel in 1903:

The bust of Liebig which was placed on the table is a gift which the Society owes to the generosity of our Fellow, Dr. Messel.

as also confirmed by the inscription on the column supporting the bust:

Justus von Liebig presented to the Chemical Society by Rudolph Messel Phd May 1903.

Another inscription, placed between the back and the right side of the bust itself, provides information about its origin:

Munchen 1873. M. Wagmuller.

The artefact was created in Munich in 1873 by Michael Wagmüller, a German sculptor who completed a number of commissions in London and exhibited at the Royal Academy.

Von Liebig is considered to have greatly contributed to the fields of agricultural and biological chemistry. He developed a manufacturing process for beef extracts and founded a company which later became Oxo. He is also credited as the inventor of Marmite.

== Augustus Wilhelm von Hofmann bust ==
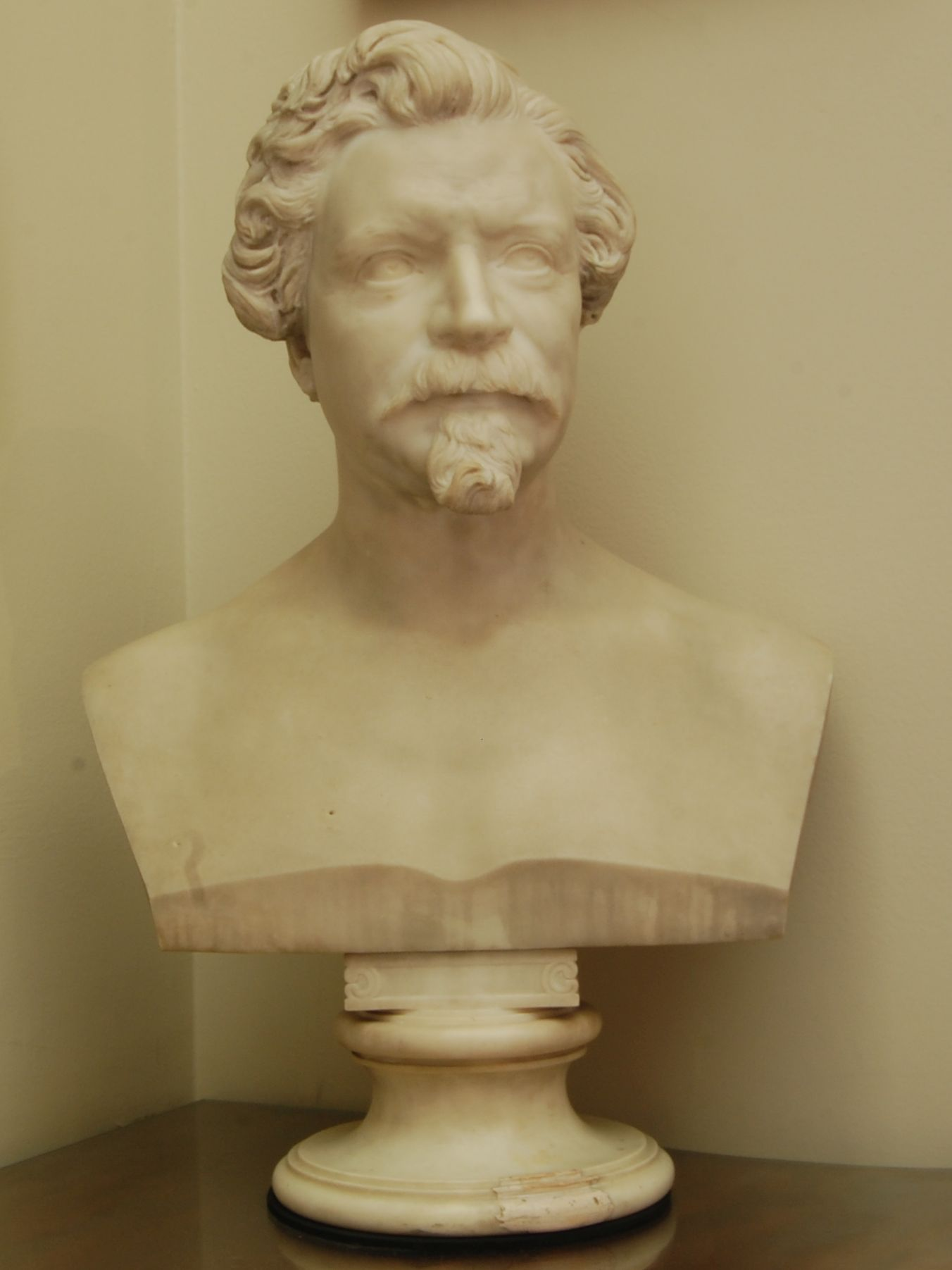
Augustus Wilhelm von Hofmann bust – Burlington House

The marble bust representing the German chemist August Wilhelm von Hofmann was introduced to the Chemical Society in 1876 by Mr James Duncan:

In recording the gratitude of the Society to those Gentlemen, the name of another Fellow, Mr. James Duncan, must be included among the recipients of our thanks, for his gift of a very interesting and valuable bust of one of our most highly-esteemed Fellows and Past Presidents, Professor Hofmann, the presentation of which, so soon after the Society had the pleasure of welcoming Dr. Hofmann as Faraday Lecturer, has been peculiarly appropriate. It is to be hoped that this handsome gift of Mr. Duncan’s and the excellent photograph of the late Dr. Anderson, presented by his widow, will not long remain the only monumental records of this kind possessed by the Society, of eminent workers in chemical science, past and living.

The inscription at the back

Joh. Pfuhl fec. Berlin 1875

certifies that this artwork was created by the German sculptor Johannes Pfuhl in Berlin in 1875.

Justus von Liebig's pupil and William Perkin's mentor, von Hofmann widely contributed to the development of the organic chemistry. He was a cofounder of the German Chemical Society and president of the Chemical Society between 1861 and 1863.

== Jean Baptiste André Dumas bust ==
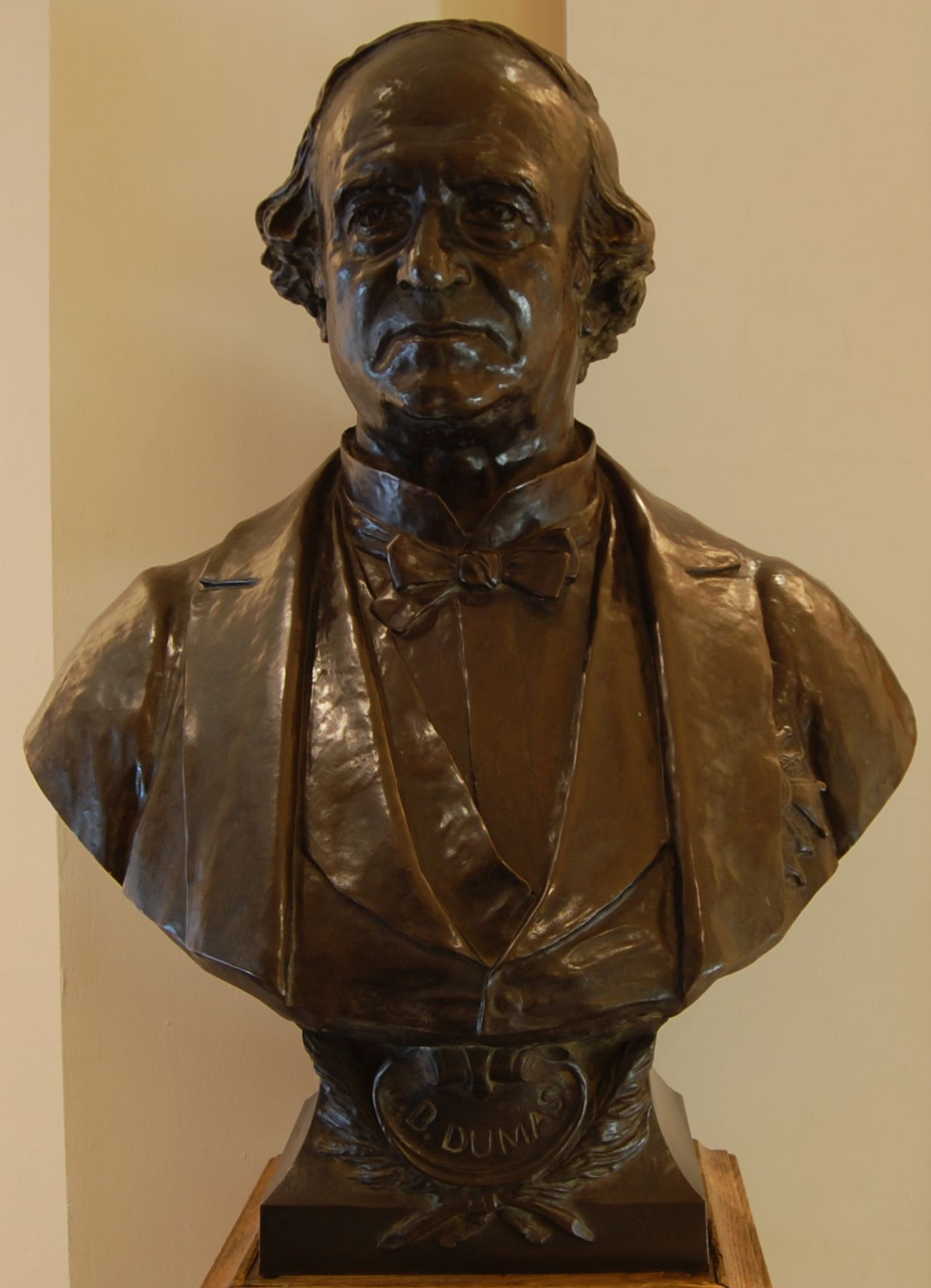
Jean Baptiste André Dumas bust – Burlington House

A bronze bust of Jean Baptiste André Dumas, the French chemist best known for his works on organic analysis and synthesis, as well as the determination of atomic weights and molecular weights by measuring vapour densities.

The sculpture was presented to the Chemical Society in 1885 by Warren De la Rue:

We have to thank one of our Past Presidents, Dr. De la Rue, who has always shown himself so ready to do anything that will add to the interest of the Society, for the bronze bust of the late Professor Dumas, which has now been placed in the library. It is contemplated placing this, and also that of Professor Hofmann, in more suitable positions than they now occupy.

An inscription on the right side of the bust provides us further information:

Eug Cvillavme 1883.

The work was created in 1883 by Jean-Baptiste Claude Eugène Guillaume, a French sculptor elected honorary member of the Royal Academy in 1869.

== Robert Boyle bust ==
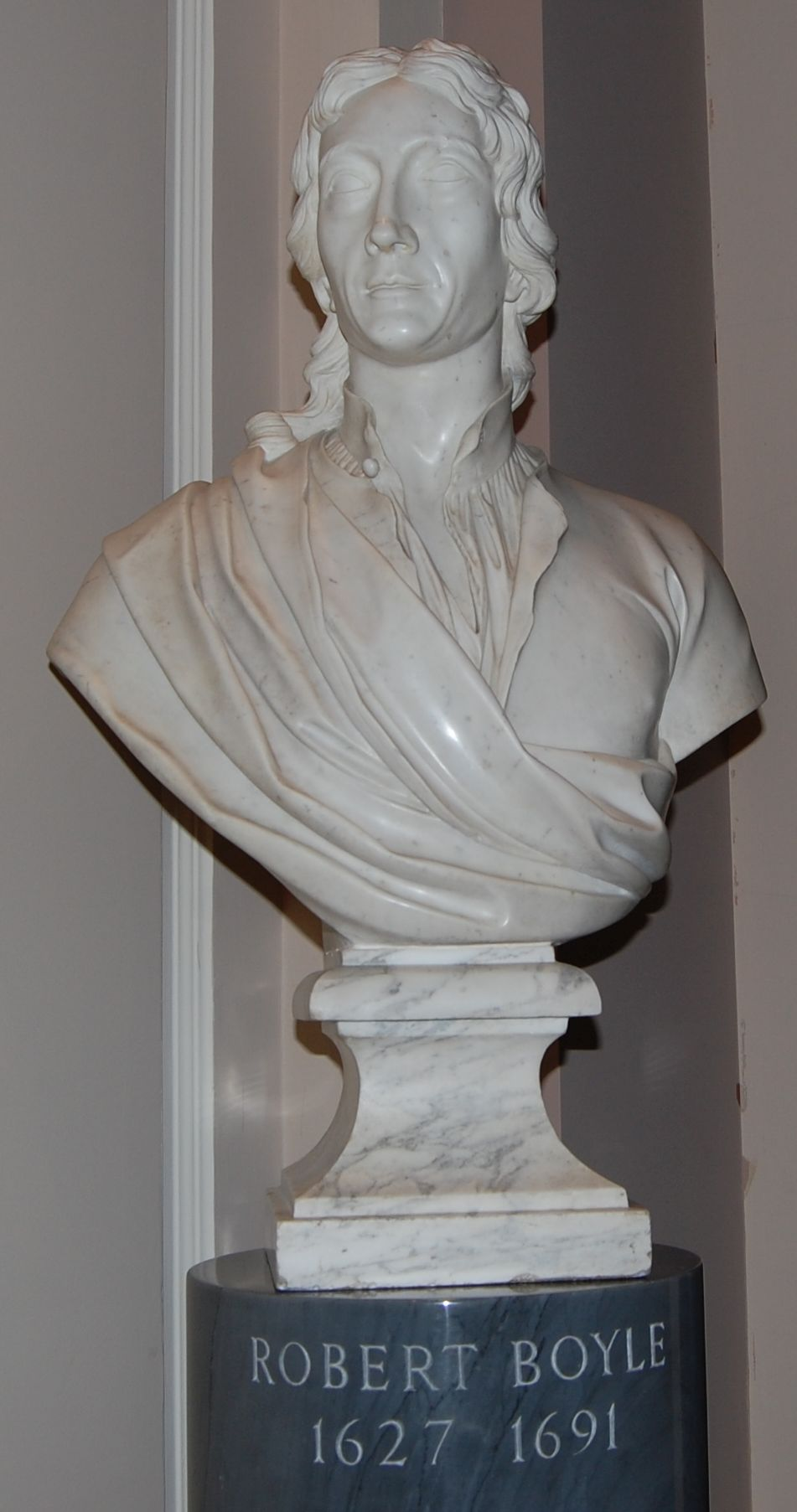
Robert Boyle bust – Burlington House

A bust of Robert Boyle, often regarded today as the first modern chemist. Acquired by the Royal Society of Chemistry in 2003 from the Chelminski Gallery, this veined white marble bust was originally commissioned in 1731 from the Italian sculptor Giovanni Battista Guelfi (1690–1736) by Lord Burlington, a relative of Boyle's, for Burlington House, which was then the earl's residence in London. This work, originally displayed at Lord Burlington's Palladian villa, Chiswick House, is virtually identical to that commissioned by Queen Caroline for her grotto at Richmond in 1732–3. The latter survives in the Royal Collection at Kensington Palace and has long been well-known. However, this other version of Guelfi's bust had hitherto been entirely unknown to Boyle scholars.

Guelfi was an Italian sculptor who trained with Camillo Rusconi in Rome and was invited by Lord Burlington, in 1714, to move to England, where he restored the Arundel marbles and executed several portrait busts and monuments.

== Joseph Priestley airpump ==
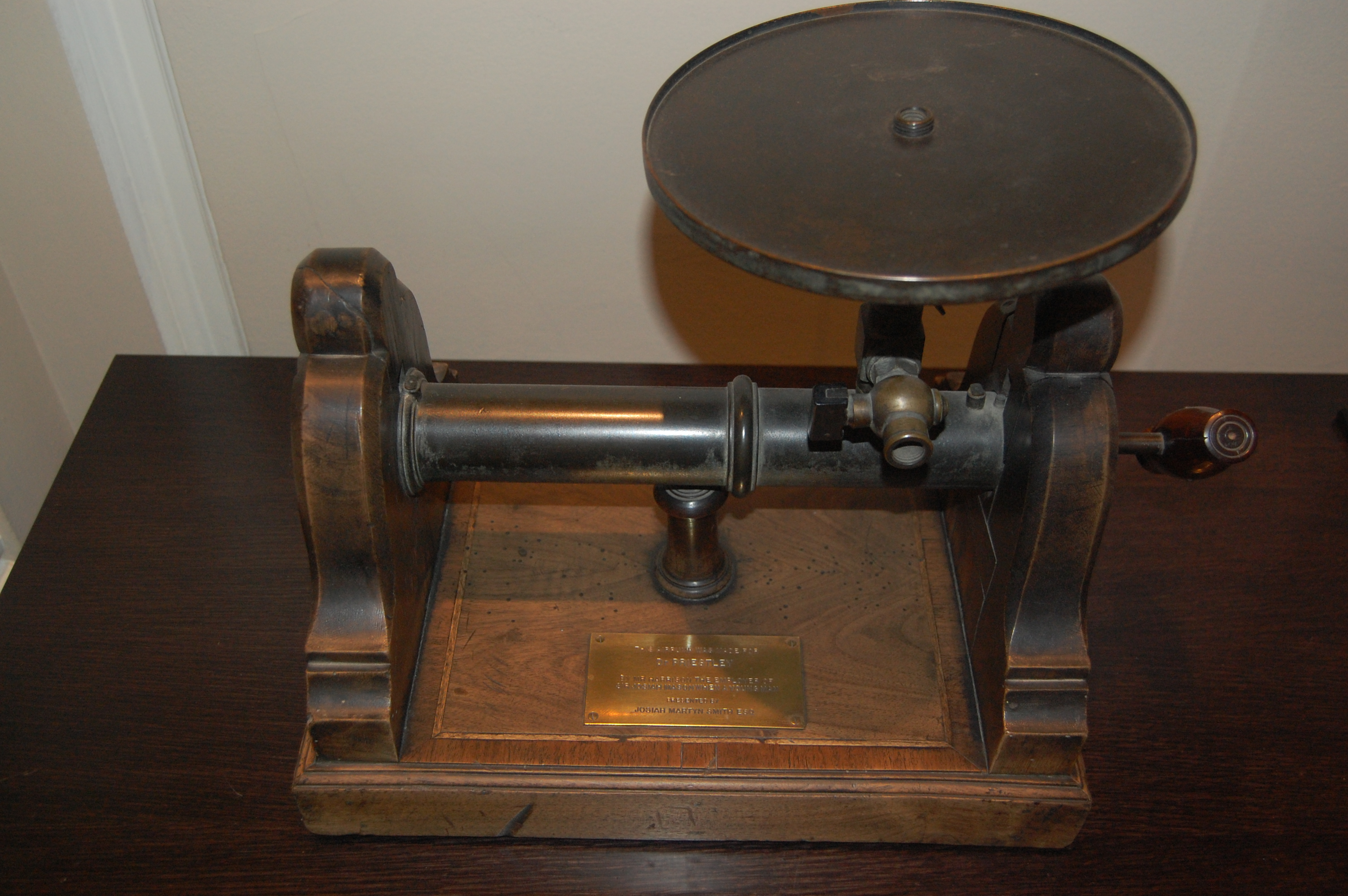
Priestley airpump – Burlington House

This artefact was created in the 18th century. Made of gunmetal raised on a cross-banded walnut and oak base (32 cm × 44 cm. × 25.5 cm), it bears a presentation plaque with the following inscription:

This airpump was made for Dr Priestley by Mr Harrison the employer of Sir Josiah Mason when a young man. Presented by Josiah Martin Smith ESQ.

Samuel Harrison (1759–1833) was a split ring maker with a workshop in Lancaster Street, Birmingham. He was a member of Priestley's congregation at the New Meeting and is known to have assisted Priestley with his experiments.

== Joseph Priestley statuette ==
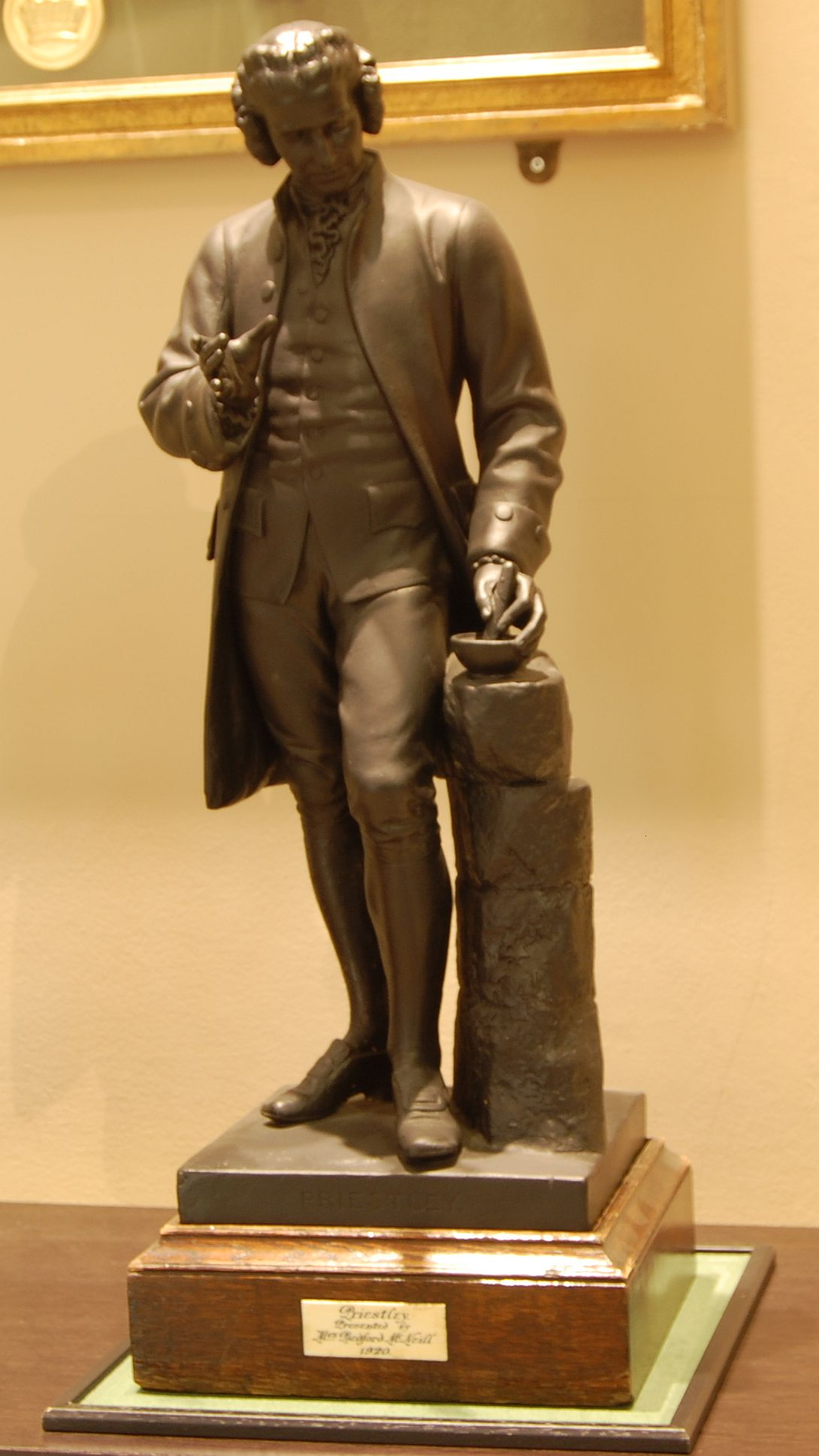
Priestley statuette – Burlington House

Raised on an oak plinth is a plaster, full-length figure of Joseph Priestley holding in his hands mortar and pestle, signed and inscribed "Esher" and dated 1874. Another inscription confirms that the statue was presented in 1920 by Mrs Bedford McNeill, as stated in the Journal and Proceedings of the Institute of Chemists of Great Britain and Ireland of that year:

I am pleased, however, to call your attention to a bronzed cast of the figure of Priestley, a replica of the well-known statue by Williamson (the father of one of our Fellows). This has been received from Mrs. Bedford McNeill, whose husband was a Priestley Scholar, a Fellow and Member of Council. We are glad to have it in memory of an esteemed colleague and also because you will recognise that the design is the main feature of the Seal of the Institute.

The full size version of this sculpture by Francis John Williamson is located in Birmingham. It was originally made in marble, then re-cast in bronze and it portrays Dr Priestley absorbed in an experiment which led to his discovery of oxygen.

== Hope: The Chemist ==
This painting (oil on canvas, 127 cm × 158 cm), was bought from the Albemarle Gallery by the Royal Society of Chemistry in 2008. It is part of Stuart Luke Gatherer's Sins and Virtues collection, which illustrates the seven sins and seven virtues using modern-day professions. It is based on an earlier classic, An Experiment on a Bird in the Air Pump (1768) by Joseph Wright, which was in turn inspired by Robert Boyle's experiment on the properties of air in the mid-17th century: a bird is deprived of air before a diversified audience and the different reactions of the spectators prove that scientific curiosity overcomes the concern for the living creature.

Stuart Luke Gatherer was brought up in the Eastern Highlands of Scotland, he graduated from Edinburgh College of Art in 1995 and exhibited across Scotland, in New York and in London.

== Schrödinger's Cat (Requiescat) ==
A painting (oil on canvas, 20 cm × 24 cm) by Christine Payne represents the well-known thought experiment Schrödinger's cat. An introductory note provides further information:

These small oil paintings which reference Schrodinger's hypothetical experiment consider the banality of representation and the representation of banality. They lie in the territory of the absurd, the paradoxical, the contradictory... and attempt to explore the space betwixt and between: the point of intervention: the moment of metamorphosis: the state of suspension within the nature of reality. For as in Schrodinger's experiment everything remains in limbo until an intelligent observer looks...

The original series consisted of nine paintings and two of them were shown in the exhibition 'Seeing Red' at the Science Museum from November 2001 to October 2002. The venue also purchased one of the paintings for their collection.

== Joseph Priestley plaque ==
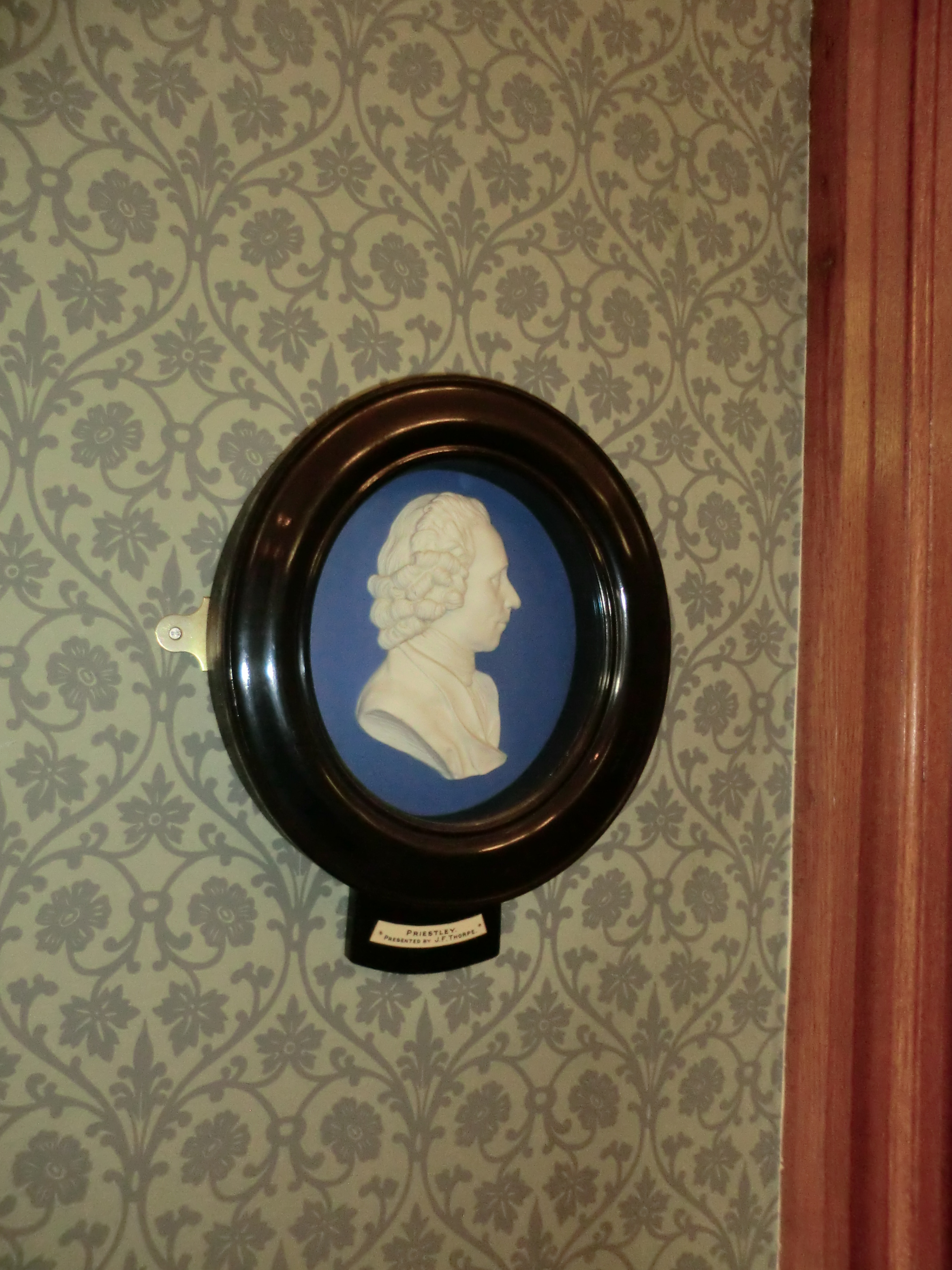
Joseph Priestley plaque – Burlington House

A large (21.5 cm × 18.5 cm) Wedgwood Jasperware oval portrait plaque of Dr Joseph Priestley, attributed to William Hackwood (c. 1779).

The ebonized frame is inscribed

Priestley, presented by J.F. Thorpe

English theologian, philosopher and chemist, Joseph Priestley is credited with the discovery of oxygen.

William Hackwood worked as prolific modeller for Josiah Wedgwood's factory between 1769 and 1832.

== Robert Boyle plaque ==
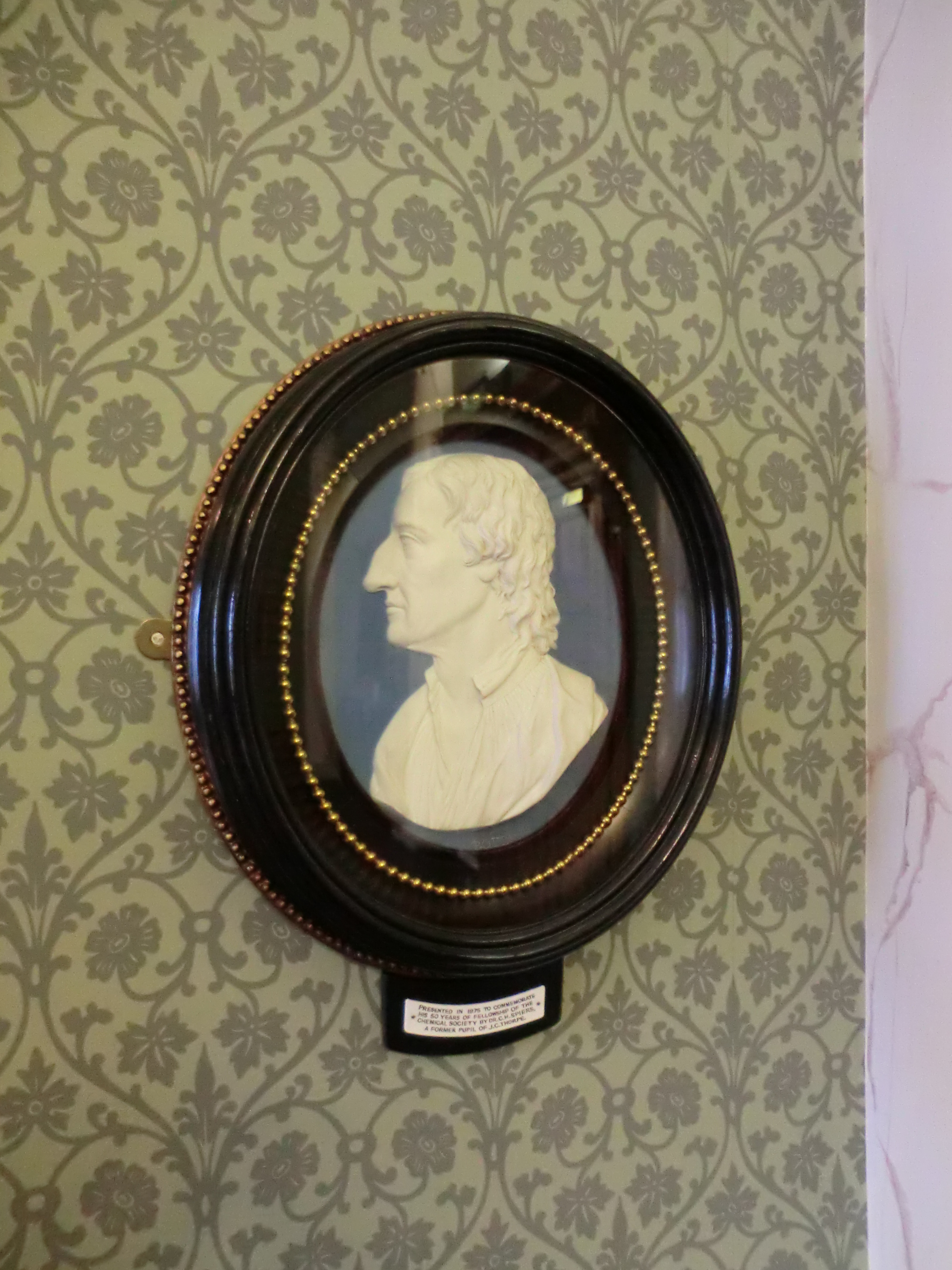
Robert Boyle plaque – Burlington House

A Wedgwood Jasperware oval portrait plaque (23 cm × 19 cm). Representing Robert Boyle, the artefacts bears, on its gilt-beaded ebonised frame, the following inscription:

Presented in 1975 to commemorate his 50 years of fellowship of the Chemical Society by Dr. C. H. Spiers, a former pupil of Jocelyn Field Thorpe.

Robert Boyle's The Sceptical Chymist is considered a foundation in the chemistry field. He is best known for the Boyle's law, which describes the inversely proportional relationship between the absolute pressure and volume of a gas, if the temperature is kept constant within a closed system.

Wedgwood is a fine china, porcelain and luxury accessories company founded in 1759 by Josiah Wedgwood.

== Benjamin Collins Brodie portrait ==
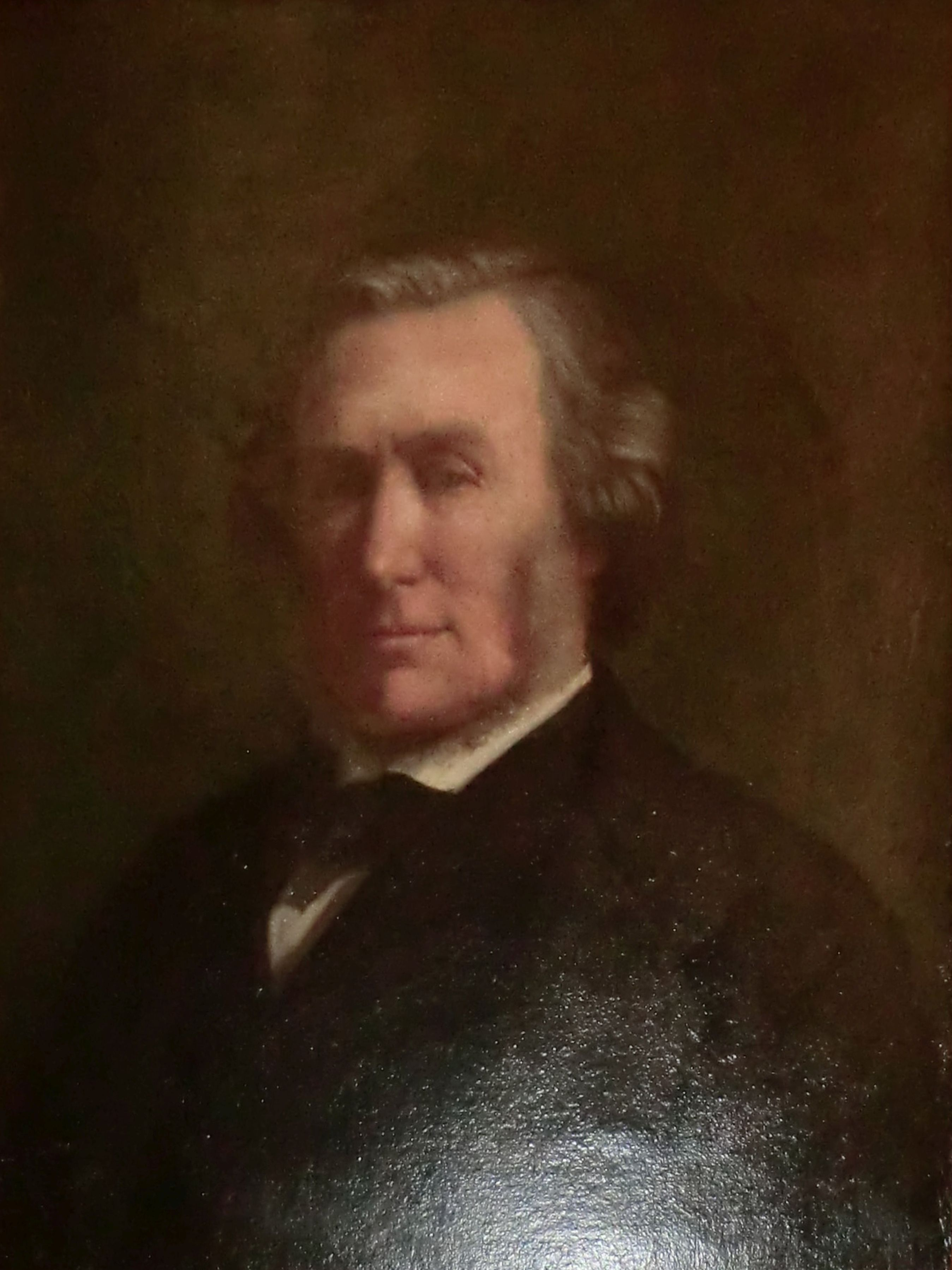
Benjamin Collins Brodie portrait – Burlington House

A head and shoulder portrait (oil on canvas, 61 cm × 49 cm) of Benjamin Collins Brodie, president of the Chemical Society between 1859 and 1861, chiefly known for his investigations on the allotropic states of carbon and for his discovery of graphitic acid.

The plate on the frame is so inscribed:

Sir Benjamin Brodie, Bart, F.R.S. President 1859–1861. Presented to the Society by the Misses P.M. and O.M. Brodie

The painting is initialled and dated:

E.A. 1874

.

== Justus von Liebig portrait ==
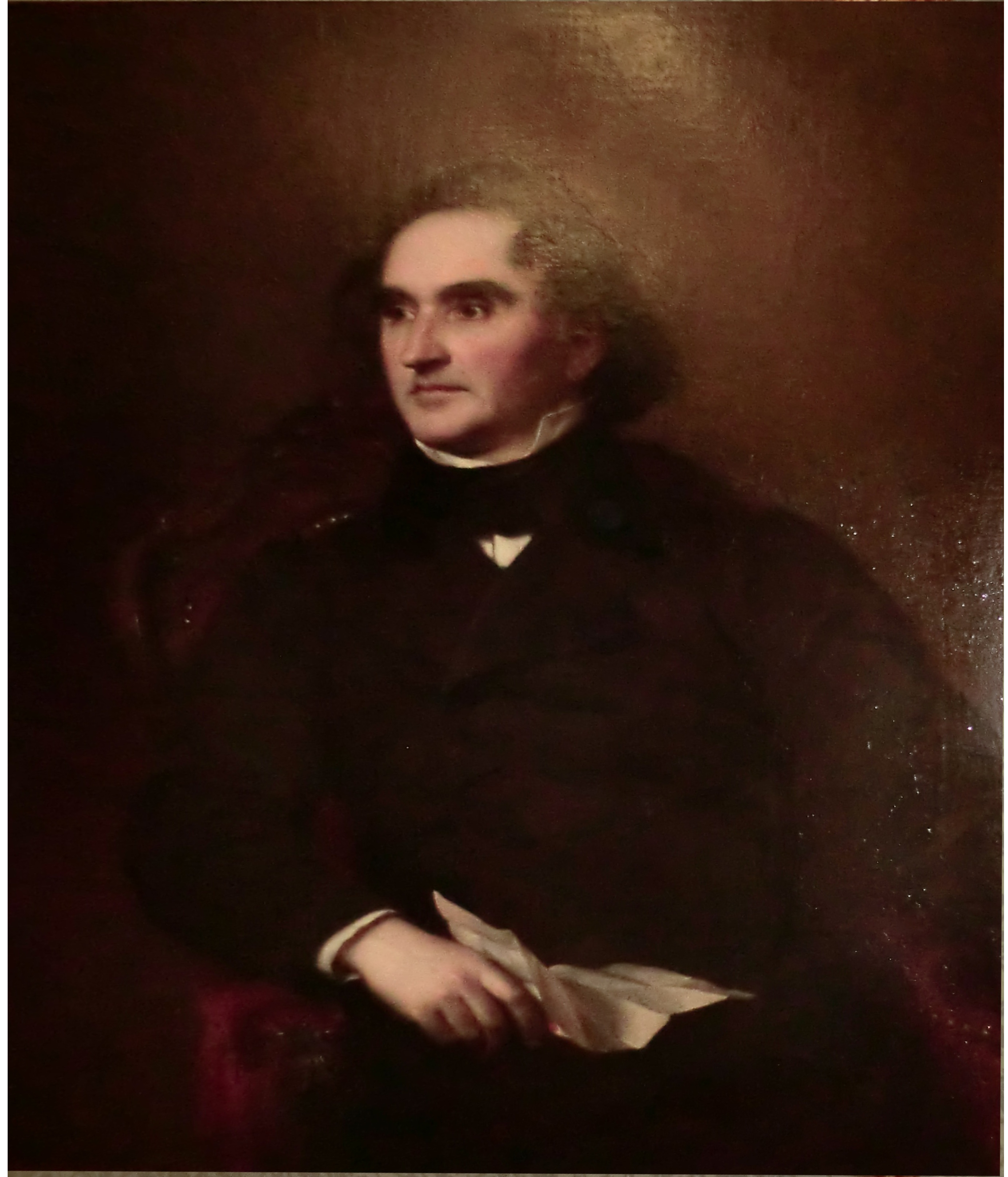
Justus von Liebig portrait – Burlington House

A three-quarter length portrait (oil on canvas, 108 cm × 85 cm) of Baron Justus Von Liebig seated, which is signed and dated 1860.

Created by the German artist Wilhelm Trautschold, this artefact was, as its plate reads:

presented to the Chemical Society in October 1926 by Mrs Alec Tweedie, Nee Harley, god-daughter of Liebig. It was to save the life of her mother, Emma Muspratt, that Liebig prepared an extract of meat.

Margaret Trautschold Hayford says Trautschold painted four portraits of Liebig, who was a close friend and a colleague of his father in law: this one is listed in the checklist of Trautschold's work as no. 34, oil 40" x 30", signed and dated 1860 (and as being in the Chemical Society of London). He was mainly active between 1849 and 1873 in Edinburgh, Liverpool and London.

== Thomas Graham portrait ==
The portrait of Thomas Graham was specially commissioned by the Chemical Society in 1931. Incoming President Professor George Henderson acknowledged this at the Annual General Meeting that year:

At the invitation of the President, Professor Thorpe, on behalf of some 20 subscribers, asked Dr. M. A. Whiteley to unveil a portrait in oils of Thomas Graham, the first President of the Society. The portrait had been painted by Mr. H. A. Budd, R.O.I., from a lithograph by W. Bosley made from a daguerreotype by Chudet. The President, in accepting the portrait for the Society, expressed the thanks of the Fellows to Professor Thorpe and all the subscribers for their generosity.

The artist, Herbert Ashwin Budd, was born in 1881 in Staffordshire and died in 1950. He designed posters for London Transport in 1930s. London based artist and teacher, he painted portraits, landscapes and townscapes in oils. In 1907 he became an associate of the Royal College of Art and began to exhibit widely in the UK, at the New English Art Club and regularly at the Royal Academy. In 1921 he became a member of the Royal Institute of Oil Painters and in 1927 was awarded an Honourable Mention at the Paris Salon. From 1929 to 1949 he taught at St Martin's School of Art.

Thomas Graham was the first president of the Chemical Society, in 1841. His main contributions to science were the studies on the diffusion of gases, resulted in Graham's law and the discovery of the medical method known as dialysis.

== Robert Boyle portrait ==
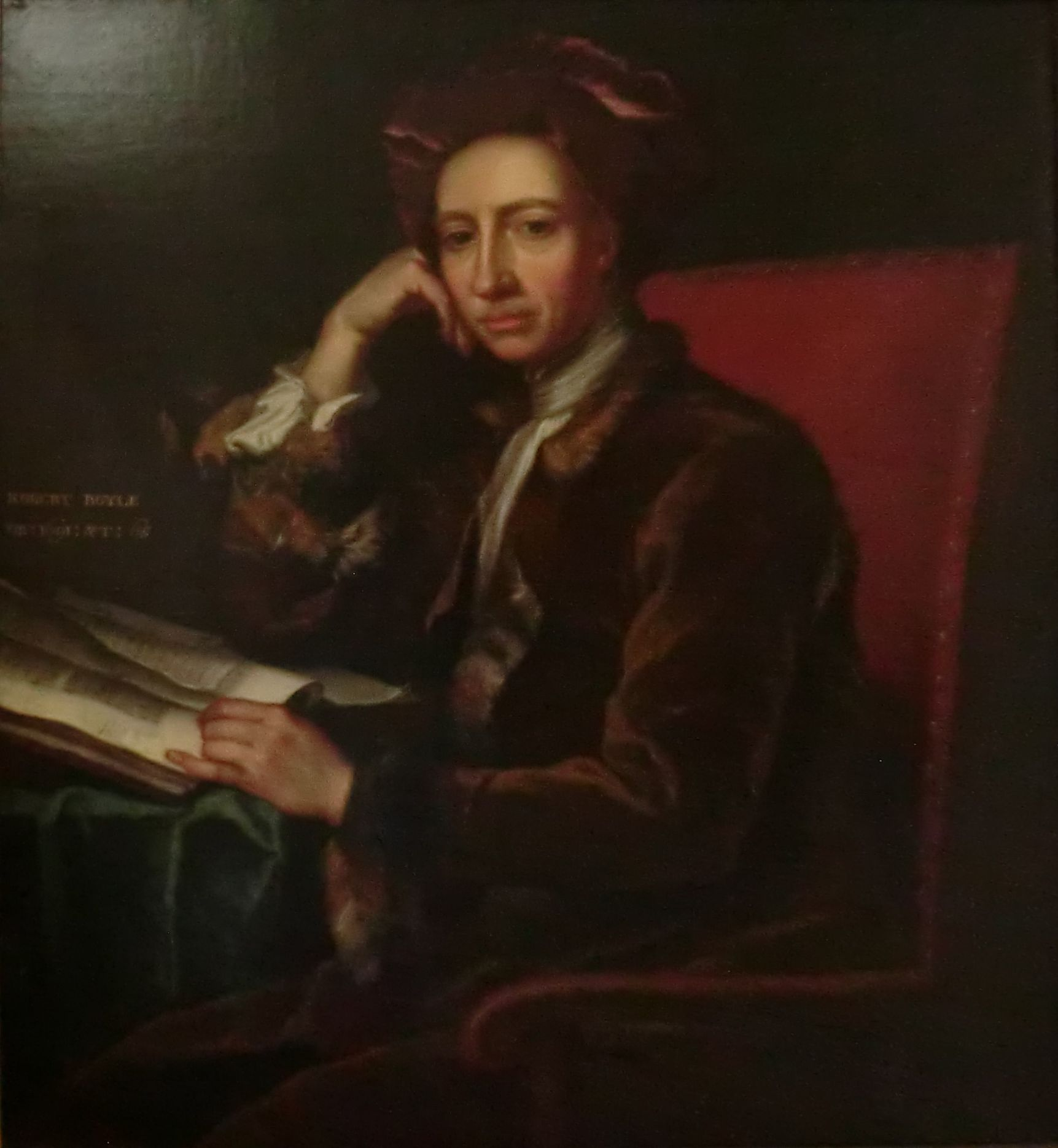
Robert Boyle portrait – Burlington House

A half-length portrait of Robert Boyle (oil on canvas 92 cm × 78.5 cm). The Journal and Proceedings of the Institute of Chemistry of Great Britain and Ireland said about the work:

The portrait of the Honourable Robert Boyle, in the Library of the Institute, is attributed to Jonathan Richardson, who left many portraits unsigned; this has been pronounced by several authorities as undoubtedly his work. The portrait bears the dates of Boyle’s birth and death (1626–1691) and was probably a posthumous portrait. Richardson was born in 1665; however, names and dates were often added to portraits long after they had been painted. The portrait resembles the engraving of a bust by Faber and bears a close likeness to Boyle’s sister, the Countess of Ranelagh, at whose house in London he lived and worked for many years. It has been objected that few of the nobility and gentlemen of the time of Charles I and James I were painted otherwise than in court dress. Portraits showing gentlemen in dressing gowns and velvet caps appeared more frequently about 1720, when Boyle had been dead nearly 30 years; but it may be suggested that Richardson preferred to represent him as a philosopher in his study. Towards the end of his life, Boyle lived very quietly in the country and did not frequent the court. The picture was purchased at a sale at Loudoun Castle, Galston, Ayrshire, and acquired for the Institute, by private subscription, in 1931.

The frame bears a plate with the inscription:

Robert Boyle 1627–1691 by the Studio of Johannes Kerseboom

and the painting itself is inscribed:

OB 1691: AET 65.

== Thomas Thomson portrait ==
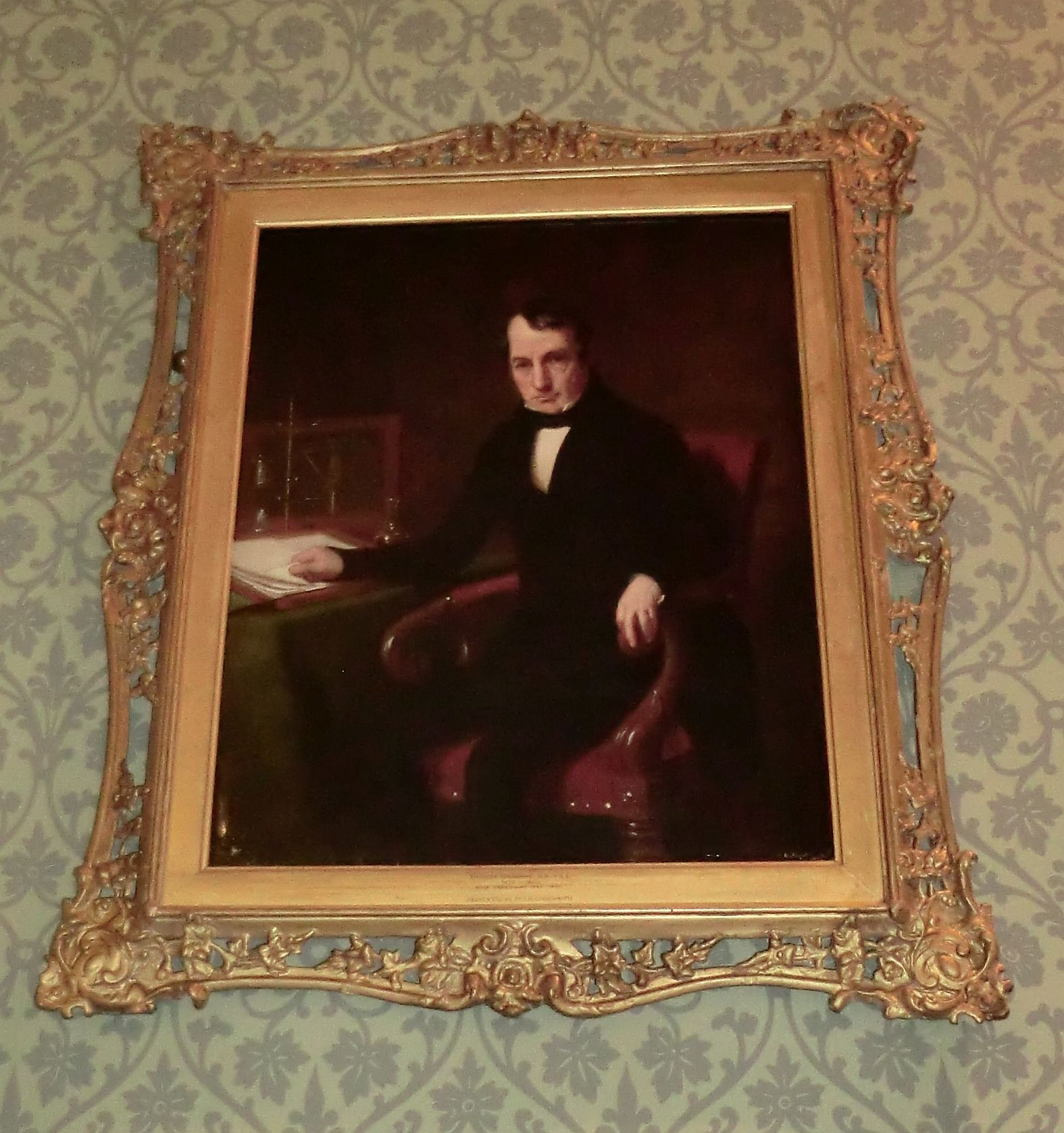
Thomas Thomson portrait – Burlington House

A three-quarter length portrait of Thomas Thomson seated at his desk (oil on board, 47 cm × 36 cm, carved giltwood frame). Attributed to the Scottish artist John Graham Gilbert, it was presented by Dr John Naish Goldsmith, as reported by the inscription on the frame:

Thomas Thomson, M.D., F.R.S. (1773–1852) Vice President 1844–1846, presented by Dr J. N. Goldsmith.

Painter and art collector, John Graham-Gilbert exhibited most of his works between the Royal Academy in London and the Royal Scottish Academy in Edinburgh.

Thomson was a Scottish chemist and mineralogist who invented a saccharometer for assessing sugar content of the fermenting must. He accorded an effective support to Dalton's atomic theory.

== James Dewar portrait ==
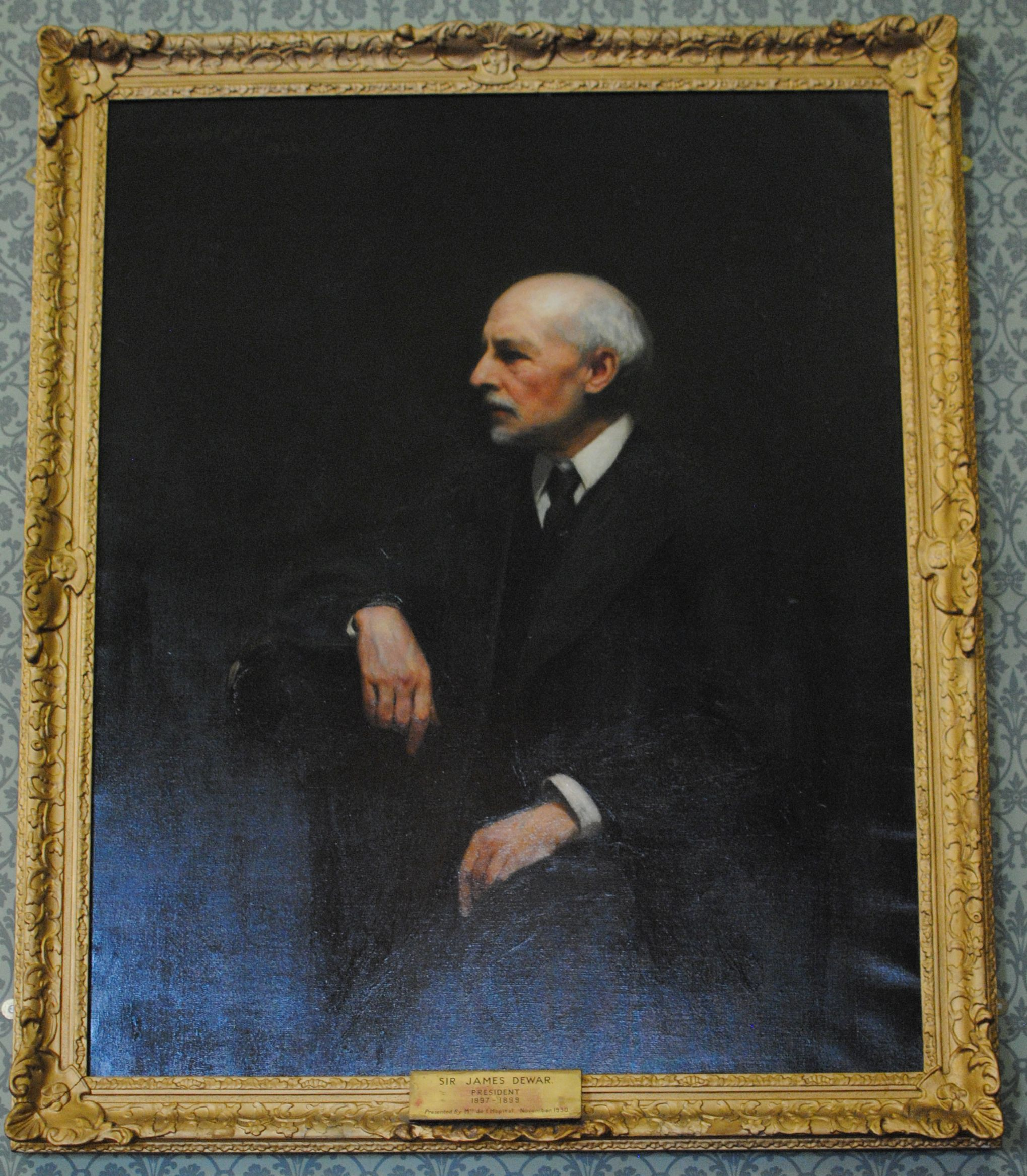
James Dewar portrait – Burlington House

A three-quarter length profile portrait of Sir James Dewar (oil on canvas, 126 cm × 101 cm). The plate on the frame is so inscribed:

Sir James Dewar. President 1897–1899. Presented by Mrs. de l'Hopital, November, 1930.

The painting is signed and dated 1923: the creator was the French artist René le Brun, Comte de L'Hôpital, who studied at the Royal Academy in London.

Scottish chemist and physicist, James Dewar is probably best known as the inventor of the Dewar flask.

== Cyril Norman Hinshelwood portrait ==
This painting (oil on canvas, 133 cm × 103 cm) depicts Sir Cyril Norman Hinshelwood seated at his desk, three-quarter length, dressed in red academic robes. The plate's frame states:

Sir Cyril Hinshelwood 1897–1967. Nobel Prizewinner for Chemistry, 1956.

Hinshelwood was an English physical chemist who gained many awards and honorary degrees. He was President of several English societies, such as the Chemical Society, the Faraday Society and the Royal Society.

The portrait is attributed to Gerald Festus Kelly, an artist born in London and educated at Cambridge University. During his life, Kelly visited many countries and exhibited more than 300 of his works at the Royal Academy, of which he was also President between 1949 and 1954.

== Raphael Meldola portrait ==
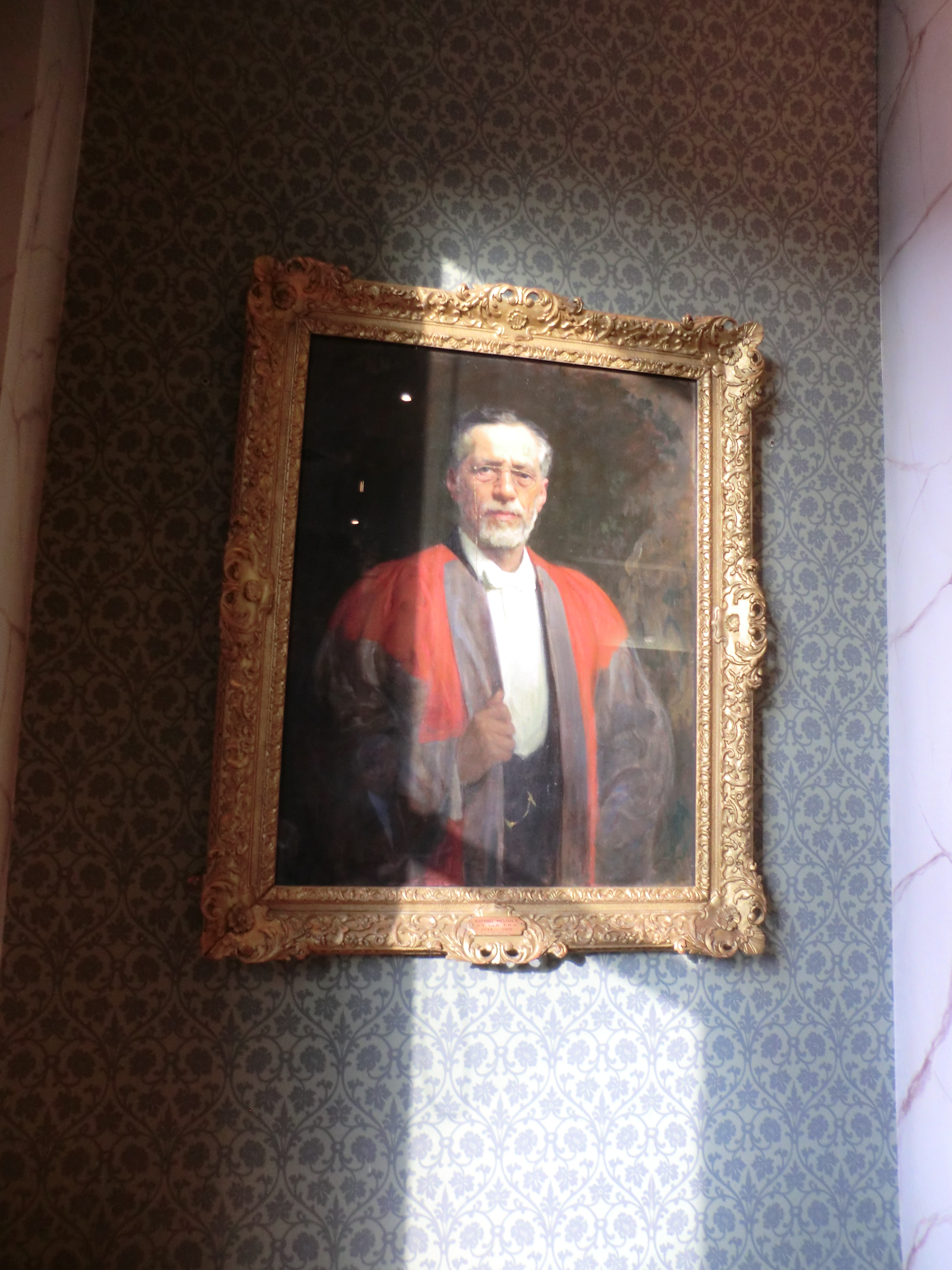
Raphael Meldola portrait – Burlington House

The Proceedings of the Institute of Chemistry of Great Britain and Ireland said of this painting:

The portrait of Prof. Meldola, referred to in the Report of the Council, was unveiled by Sir James Dobbie, President of the Institute, at a Special Meeting of the Council held on December 15th, 1917. Mrs. Meldola, Lady Dobbk, Prof. and Mrs. Poulton, and a number of friends and past students of Prof. Meldola were also present. The President said that Sir George Keilby had on the same afternoon unveiled another portrait of Prof. Meldola, by the same artist (Solomon J. Solomon), at the Royal Society. He referred to the late Professor’s interest in science generally as well as in that which he had chosen as his profession. It was fitting that such a memorial should find a place in the Council Room, especially in view of the valuable services rendered to the Institute by Prof. Meldola in connection with the new building during the last few years of his life. After alluding to the extraordinary range and varied character of Prof. Meldola’s activities in teaching, in research and in public affairs, he paid a tribute to his personal qualities as a man, remarking on his strong character and influence, his appreciation of humour, his fine literary gift and powers of conversation. Having unveiled the portrait the President warmly praised the work. All would agree that the artist had achieved a remarkable success. He also expressed the hearty thanks of the Institute to those who had subscribed to the presentation, and to Prof. Poulton for having been the means whereby the Institute had become possessed of such a valuable memorial to its past President. Prof. Poulton having replied, Mr. Gordon Salamon, Hon. Treasurer, also spoke in appreciation of the gift, and the President’s remarks were warmly endorsed by Mr. A. J. Chapman, a former student of Prof. Meldola.

Member of the Royal Academy, Solomon Joseph Solomon was a British artist who produced works of different style and different subjects, being very productive as innovative portraitist.

Raphael Meldola, British chemist and entomologist, was president of the Chemical Society between 1905 and 1907.

== Michael Faraday's Royal Institution Christmas Lecture before the Prince Consort ==
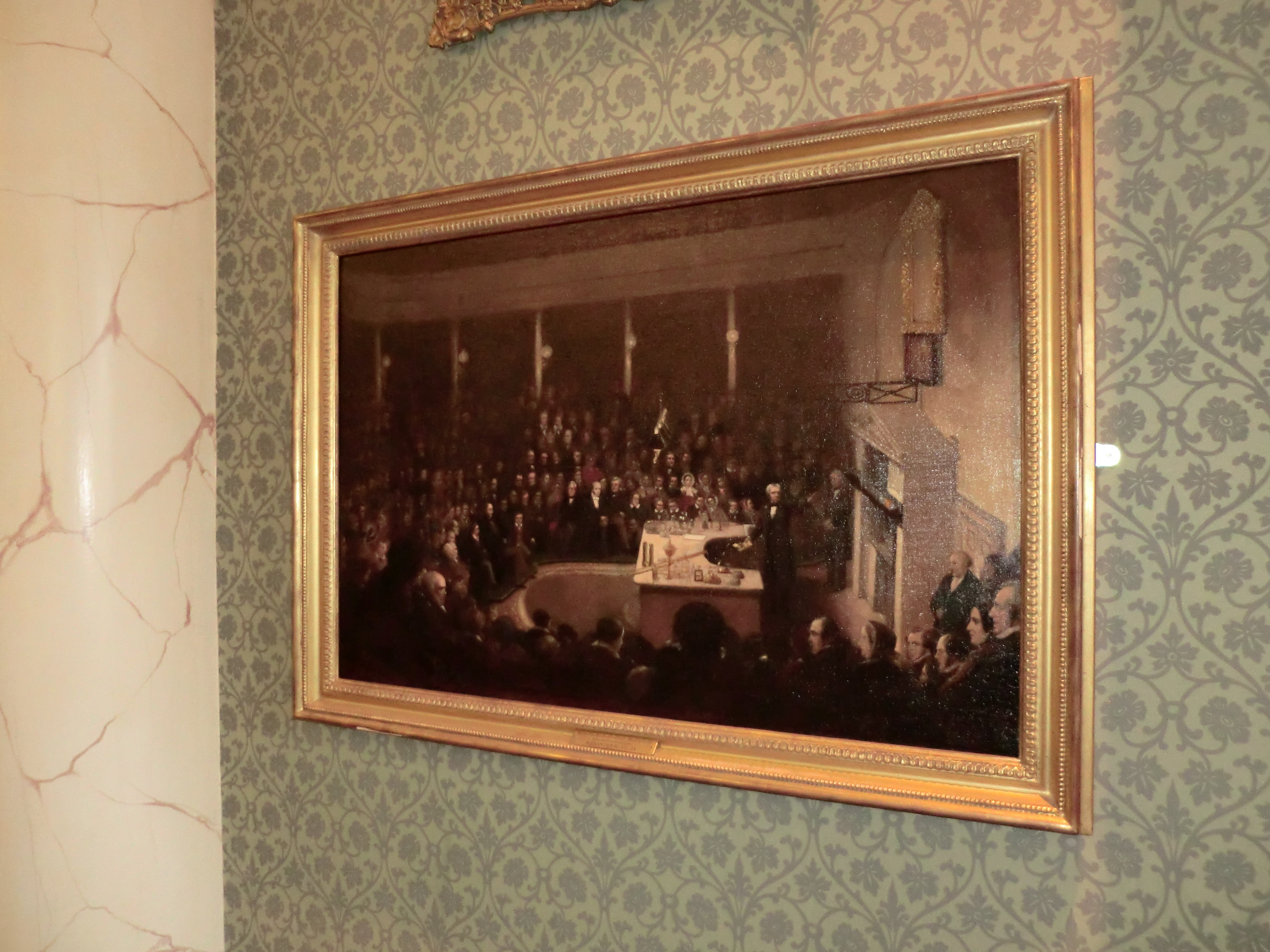
Alexander Blaikley, Michael Faraday's Royal Institution Christmas Lecture before the Prince Consort. Oil on canvas, 59 cm × 89 cm. Burlington House

This painting shows Michael Faraday giving one of a course of six Christmas Lectures at the Royal Institution. Focused on the distinctive properties of common metals, these lectures were delivered between 27 December 1855 and 8 January 1856. Prince Albert, the Prince Consort (Queen Victoria's husband), and the Prince of Wales (later King Edward VII) are in the front row.

The painting was purchased by the Faraday Society from the private museum of the Nowel ffarington family of Worden Hall in 1949. The plate on the frame gives the artist's name, Alexander Blaikley (1816–1903). Born in Glasgow, Blaikley studied at the Trustees' Academy and at the Royal Academy, where he then exhibited most of his works.
