= Dalton Transactions =

- Discipline: Chemistry
- Language: English
- Edited by: Russell Morris

Publication details
- Former names: Journal of the Chemical Society A: Inorganic, Physical, Theoretical; Journal of the Chemical Society; Dalton Transactions: Inorganic Chemistry
- History: 1966–present
- Publisher: Royal Society of Chemistry (United Kingdom)
- Frequency: Weekly
- Open access: Hybrid
- Impact factor: 3.5 (2023)

Standard abbreviations
- ISO 4: Dalton Trans.

Indexing
- CODEN: DTARAF
- ISSN: 1477-9226 (print); 1477-9234 (web)
- LCCN: 2003242012
- OCLC no.: 51500500

Links
- Journal homepage; Online archive

Dalton Transactions is a weekly peer-reviewed scientific journal covering original (primary) research and review articles on all aspects of the chemistry of inorganic, bioinorganic, and organometallic compounds. It is published by the Royal Society of Chemistry and the editor-in-chief is Russell Morris (University of St Andrews). The journal was named after the English chemist, John Dalton, best known for his work on modern atomic theory. The journal was named a "rising star" in 2006.

== Publication history ==
The journal was established as the Journal of the Chemical Society A: Inorganic, Physical, Theoretical in 1966. In 1972, the journal was divided into three separate journals: Journal of the Chemical Society, Dalton Transactions (covering inorganic and organometallic chemistry), Journal of the Chemical Society, Faraday Transactions 1: Physical Chemistry in Condensed Phases, and Journal of the Chemical Society, Faraday Transactions 2: Molecular and Chemical Physics. The journal obtained its current name in 2003. In January 2000, Acta Chemica Scandinavica was absorbed.

The Journal of the Chemical Society, Dalton Transactions was published as 12 issues a year from 1972. As submissions increased, the journal switched to 24 issues a year in 1992 and then to 48 issues a year in 2006.

In 2010, the journal introduced a sequential volume numbering scheme, with one volume per year. While volume numbers were not assigned retro-actively, the first issue of 2010 was assigned volume 39 (2010 being the 39th year since the establishment of the Journal of the Chemical Society, Dalton Transactions.

== Abstracting and indexing ==
The journal is abstracted and indexed in:

- Aquatic Sciences and Fisheries Abstracts
- Chemical Abstracts Service
- Current Chemical Reactions
- Current Contents/Physical, Chemical & Earth Sciences
- EBSCO databases
- Ei Compendex
- Embase
- Index Medicus/MEDLINE/PubMed
- Science Citation Index Expanded
- Scopus

According to the Journal Citation Reports, the journal has a 2023 impact factor of 3.5.

== Notable articles ==
According to the Web of Science, the following three articles have been cited most often:

1. C Janiak (2000). "A critical account on π–π stacking in metal complexes with aromatic nitrogen-containing ligands". Dalton Trans. (21): 3885–3896. doi:10.1039/B003010O.
2. C Janiak (2003). "Engineering coordination polymers towards applications". Dalton Trans. (14): 2781–2894. doi:10.1039/B305705B. S2CID 96914248.
3. M Bochmann (1996). "Cationic Group 4 metallocene complexes and their role in polymerisation catalysis: the chemistry of well defined Ziegler catalysts". J. Chem. Soc., Dalton Trans. (3): 255–270. doi:10.1039/DT9960000255.

== Dalton Discussions ==
Dalton Discussions are scientific meetings that provide a forum for the exchange of views and newly acquired results in focused areas of inorganic chemistry. The papers, which are associated with the oral presentations at the meeting, are published in a special issue of the journal, which constitutes a permanent record of the meeting. The meetings are usually held annually.

== See also ==
- List of scientific journals in chemistry
- Important publications in inorganic chemistry
