= Canadian Journal of Chemistry =

Canadian Journal of Chemistry Revue canadienne de chimie
- Discipline: Chemistry
- Language: English, French
- Edited by: Yining Huang and Stacey Wetmore

Publication details
- History: 1951-present
- Publisher: NRC Research Press (Canada)
- Frequency: Monthly
- Impact factor: 1.1 (2022)

Standard abbreviations
- ISO 4: Can. J. Chem.

Indexing
- CODEN: CJCHAG
- ISSN: 0008-4042 (print); 1480-3291 (web)
- LCCN: 54024664
- OCLC no.: 02248672

Links
- Journal homepage; Online archive; About the Journal

The Canadian Journal of Chemistry (fr. Revue canadienne de chimie) is a peer-reviewed scientific journal published by NRC Research Press. It was established in 1951 as the continuation of Canadian Journal of Research, Section B: Chemical Sciences. Papers are loaded to the web in advance of the printed issue and are available in both pdf and HTML formats. The journal is affiliated with the Canadian Society for Chemistry.

== Abstracting and indexing ==
The journal is abstracted and indexed by the following services: Chemical Abstracts, ChemInform, Chemistry Citation Index, Compendex, Current Contents, Derwent Biotechnology Abstracts, GeoRef, INIS Atomindex, Methods in Organic Synthesis, Referativny Zhurnal, and the Science Citation Index. According to the Journal Citation Reports, its 2022 impact factor is 1.1.
