= Analytica =

Analytica may refer to:

- Analytica Corporation, developer of Borland Reflex
- Analytica (software), computer software for quantitative decision models
- Analytica (trade fair), a trade fair for laboratory technology, analysis and biotechnology
- Analytica Chimica Acta, a scientific journal
- Analytica Priora, Aristotle 's work on deductive reasoning
- Oxford Analytica, an international consulting firm
