= Canadian Journal of Research =

- Language: English

Publication details
- History: 1929–1950
- Publisher: National Research Council of Canada (Canada)

Standard abbreviations
- ISO 4: Can. J. Res.

Indexing
- CODEN: CJREAE
- ISSN: 0366-6581

Links
- Journal homepage; Online access

The Canadian Journal of Research is a defunct peer-reviewed scientific journal established in 1929 by the National Research Council of Canada. In 1935, it split into 4 subsections, and expanded with another 2 subsections in 1944. In 1951, each subsection formed their own distinct journal:

- Canadian Journal of Research, Section A: Physical Sciences (1935−1950, ISSN 0366-7383) going on as Canadian Journal of Physics.
- Canadian Journal of Research, Section B: Chemical Sciences (1935−1950, ISSN 0366-7391) going on as Canadian Journal of Chemistry.
- Canadian Journal of Research, Section C: Botanical Sciences (1935−1950, ISSN 0366-7405) going on as Canadian Journal of Botany.
- Canadian Journal of Research, Section D: Zoological Sciences (1935−1950, ISSN 0366-7413) going on as Canadian Journal of Zoology.
- Canadian Journal of Research, Section E: Medical Sciences (1944−1950, ISSN 0366-743X) going on as Canadian Journal of Medical Sciences.
- Canadian Journal of Research, Section F: Technology (1944−1950, ISSN 0315-2030) going on as Canadian Journal of Technology.
