= Journal of Cluster Science =

- Discipline: Chemistry
- Language: English
- Edited by: Boon Teo, Gareth Williams, Timothy Prior

Publication details
- History: 1990-present
- Publisher: Springer Science+Business Media
- Frequency: Quarterly
- Impact factor: 4.1 (2025)

Standard abbreviations
- ISO 4: J. Clust. Sci.

Indexing
- CODEN: JCSCEB
- ISSN: 1040-7278 (print); 1572-8862 (web)
- LCCN: 90642753
- OCLC no.: 18516182

Links
- Journal homepage

The Journal of Cluster Science is a quarterly peer-reviewed scientific journal covering all aspects of cluster science, including nanoclusters and nanoparticles. It is published by Springer Science+Business Media and the co-editors-in-chief are Boon Teo, Gareth Williams, Timothy Prior.

== Abstracting and indexing ==
The journal is abstracted and indexed in:

- Chemical Abstracts Service/CASSI
- Science Citation Index
- Scopus
- Academic OneFile
- Astrophysics Data System
- GeoRef

According to the Journal Citation Reports, the journal has a 2023 impact factor of 2.7.

== See also ==
- List of scientific journals in chemistry
