= Perkin Transactions =

- Discipline: Chemistry
- Language: English

Publication details
- History: 1997 to 2002
- Publisher: Royal Society of Chemistry (United Kingdom)

Standard abbreviations
- ISO 4: Perkin Trans.

Links
- Journal homepage

Perkin Transactions is a scientific journal devoted to organic chemistry published from 1997 to 2002 by the Royal Society of Chemistry. It was split into Perkin Transactions I and Perkin Transactions II. The predecessor journals published by the Chemical Society before the merger of that Society with other Societies to form the Royal Society of Chemistry were the Journal of the Chemical Society, Perkin Transactions 1 and Journal of the Chemical Society, Perkin Transactions 2 (1972-1996). They were replaced by Organic and Biomolecular Chemistry. The name honours the chemist Arthur George Perkin.

== See also ==
- List of scientific journals in chemistry
- List of scientific journals
