= Environmental Science: Processes & Impacts =

- Discipline: Environmental science
- Language: English
- Edited by: Kris McNeill

Publication details
- Former name: Journal of Environmental Monitoring
- History: 1999-present
- Publisher: Royal Society of Chemistry (United Kingdom)
- Frequency: Monthly
- Impact factor: 5.334 (2021)

Standard abbreviations
- ISO 4: Environ. Sci.: Process. Impacts

Indexing
- ISSN: 2050-7887 (print); 2050-7895 (web)
- LCCN: 2013243138
- OCLC no.: 844721788

Links
- Journal homepage; Online archive

Environmental Science: Processes & Impacts is a monthly peer-reviewed scientific journal covering all aspects of environmental science. It is published by the Royal Society of Chemistry and Kris McNeill is the editor-in-chief. The journal was established in 1999 as the Journal of Environmental Monitoring and obtained its current title in 2013.

== Article types ==
The journal publishes full research papers, communications, perspectives, critical reviews, frontier reviews, tutorial reviews, comments, and highlights.

== Abstracting and indexing ==
According to the Journal Citation Reports, the journal has a 2021 impact factor of 5.334.

The journal is abstracted and indexed in:

- Analytical Abstracts
- Chemical Abstracts Service
- Embase/Excerpta Medica
- Elsevier BIOBASE
- Current Awareness in Biological Sciences
- Index Medicus/MEDLINE/PubMed
- CAB International
- VINITI Database RAS
- Science Citation Index
- Current Contents/Agriculture
- Biology & Environmental Sciences
- Current Contents/Physical
- Chemical & Earth Sciences
- The Zoological Record
- BIOSIS Previews

== Sister journals ==
The Royal Society of Chemistry publishes 2 other journals in the Environmental Science portfolio: Environmental Science: Nano was established in 2014 and Environmental Science: Water Research & Technology in 2015.

== See also ==
- List of chemistry journals
