= Organic and Biomolecular Chemistry =

Organic & Biomolecular Chemistry
- Discipline: Organic chemistry
- Language: English
- Edited by: Anthony Davis

Publication details
- History: 2003-present
- Publisher: Royal Society of Chemistry (United Kingdom)
- Frequency: Weekly
- Impact factor: 3.2 (2022)

Standard abbreviations
- ISO 4: Org. Biomol. Chem.

Indexing
- CODEN: OBCRAK
- ISSN: 1477-0520 (print); 1477-0539 (web)
- LCCN: 2003261024
- OCLC no.: 884652802

Links
- Journal homepage

Organic & Biomolecular Chemistry is a weekly peer-reviewed scientific journal covering all aspects of organic chemistry, including organic aspects of chemical biology, medicinal chemistry, natural product chemistry, supramolecular chemistry, macromolecular chemistry, theoretical chemistry, and catalysis. It is published by the Royal Society of Chemistry. Its predecessor journals were Perkin Transactions I and Perkin Transactions II. The Executive Editor is Richard Kelly.

== Abstracting and indexing ==
The journal is abstracted and indexed in:

- Chemical Abstracts Service
- Index Medicus/MEDLINE/PubMed
- Science Citation Index
- Current Contents/Life Sciences
- Current Contents/Physical, Chemical & Earth Sciences
- Scopus

According to the Journal Citation Reports, the journal has a 2021 impact factor of 3.890.

== See also ==
- Natural Product Reports
- MedChemComm
- List of scientific journals
- List of scientific journals in chemistry
