= Journal of Cellular Plastics =

- Discipline: Materials science
- Language: English
- Edited by: Chul B. Park

Publication details
- History: 1965-present
- Publisher: SAGE Publications
- Frequency: Bimonthly
- Impact factor: 3.073 (2020)

Standard abbreviations
- ISO 4: J. Cell. Plast.

Indexing
- CODEN: JCUPAM
- ISSN: 0021-955X (print); 1530-7999 (web)
- LCCN: 64009474
- OCLC no.: 465328571

Links
- Journal homepage; Online access; Online archive

The Journal of Cellular Plastics is a bimonthly peer-reviewed scientific journal that covers the field of polymer science and foamed plastics technology. The journal was established in 1965 and is published by SAGE Publications. it was established in 1965 and the editors-in-chief are Chul B. Park (University of Toronto).

== Abstracting and indexing ==
The journal is abstracted and indexed in:

- Academic Search Premier
- Chemical Abstracts Service
- Compendex
- Current Contents/Engineering, Computing & Technology
- Engineered Materials Abstracts
- Environmental Sciences & Pollution Management
- Health Source
- Material Science Citation Index
- PASCAL
- Science Citation Index Expanded

According to the Journal Citation Reports, the journal has a 2020 impact factor of 3.073.
