= Journal of Experimental Nanoscience =

- Discipline: Nanoscience
- Language: English
- Edited by: Nick Quirke

Publication details
- History: 2006-present
- Publisher: Taylor & Francis
- Frequency: Bimonthly
- Impact factor: 2.6 (2023)

Standard abbreviations
- ISO 4: J. Exp. Nanosci.

Indexing
- CODEN: JENOBX
- ISSN: 1745-8080 (print); 1745-8099 (web)
- LCCN: 2007243092
- OCLC no.: 288963937

Links
- Journal homepage

The Journal of Experimental Nanoscience is a peer-reviewed scientific journal covering original (primary) research and review articles on all aspects of nanoscience. It is published bimonthly by Taylor & Francis. The editor-in-chief is Nick Quirke (Imperial College).

== Scope ==
The Journal of Experimental Nanoscience covers research in the experimental sciences related to nanotechnology and nanomaterials, in research areas such as biology, physics, chemistry, chemical engineering, electrical engineering, mechanical engineering, materials, pharmaceuticals, and medicine.

== Abstracting and indexing ==
Journal of Experimental Nanoscience is abstracted and indexed in:

- Chemical Abstracts Service
- Science Citation Index
- Web of Science
- Scopus

According to the Journal Citation Reports, the journal has a 2023 impact factor of 2.6.
