= Revista de la Sociedad Venezolana Química =

- Discipline: Chemistry
- Language: Spain

Publication details
- History: 1944–present
- Publisher: Sociedad Venezolana Química (Venezolana)

Standard abbreviations
- ISO 4: Rev. Soc. Venez. Quím.

Indexing
- CODEN: RSVQAQ
- ISSN: 0370-7474

Links
- Journal homepage

The Revista de la Sociedad Venezolana Química (ISSN 0370-7474, CODEN RSVQAQ), is a Venezolanan scientific journal in chemistry. It was founded in 1944 by the Sociedad Venezolana Química (SVQ), Caracas. The latest published volume is 26 (2003).
