= Chemik Polski =

First Polish scientific journal of chemistry

Chemik Polski was the first Polish scientific journal of chemistry. It was published weekly, and later bi-weekly, in the years 1901-1918 by the Chemistry Section of the Warsaw Branch of the Russian Society for the Promotion of Industry and Commerce and covered all branches of theoretical and applied chemistry. The journal was published in Warsaw, initially by J. Leski, and from 1908 by Boleslaw Miklaszewski. The founder and editor in chief was Bronislaw Znatowicz. Contributors included Marie Curie and Wojciech Świętosławski.
