= Journal of Separation Science =

- Discipline: Analytical chemistry
- Language: English
- Edited by: František Švec

Publication details
- Former name(s): Journal of High Resolution Chromatography & Chromatography Communications: HRC & CC; Journal of High Resolution Chromatography
- History: 1978–present
- Publisher: Wiley-VCH
- Frequency: 24/year
- Open access: Hybrid
- Impact factor: 3.645 (2020)

Standard abbreviations
- ISO 4: J. Sep. Sci.

Indexing
- CODEN: JSSCCJ
- ISSN: 1615-9306 (print); 1615-9314 (web)

Links
- Journal homepage; Online access; Online archive

The Journal of Separation Science is a biweekly peer-reviewed scientific journal covering analytical chemistry. It was established in 1978 as the Journal of High Resolution Chromatography & Chromatography Communications: HRC & CC. In 1989, it was renamed the Journal of High Resolution Chromatography. It obtained its current name in 2001, when it also absorbed the preexisting Journal of Microcolumn Separations, which had been established in 1989. It is an organ of the European Society for Separation Science and the California Separation Science Society. The editor-in-chief is František Švec (Charles University). According to the Journal Citation Reports, the journal has a 2020 impact factor of 3.645, ranking it 25th out of 83 journals in the category "Chemistry, Analytical".
