= Ion Exchange Letters =

- Discipline: Chemistry
- Language: English

Publication details
- History: 2008 to present
- Publisher: Department of Power Engineering, ICT Prague (Czech Republic)
- Open access: All papers are freely accessible

Standard abbreviations
- ISO 4: Ion Exch. Lett.

Indexing
- CODEN: IELOAB
- ISSN: 1803-4039

Links
- Journal homepage

Ion Exchange Letters is an open access scientific journal. This journal was established in 2008 to provide a platform for students and young scientists to publish letters and short communications. Journal covers following fields:

The journal covers several fields focusing mainly on ion exchange and selective sorption. Ion exchange topics covered include synthesis and characterization, as well as applications such as water decontamination. Selective sorption topics covered include the modification and utilization of biosorbents and the use of selective ligands for metal sorption. The journal also publishes research on hybrid processes combining ion exchange and waste minimization in ion exchange and sorption processes.
