= Synthetic Reaction Updates =

- Producer: Royal Society of Chemistry (United Kingdom)
- History: 2015-2021

Coverage
- Disciplines: Chemistry
- Update frequency: Weekly

Links
- Website: pubs.rsc.org/lus/synthetic-reaction-updates/

Synthetic Reaction Updates was a current awareness bibliographic database from the Royal Society of Chemistry that provided alerts of recently published developments in synthetic organic chemistry.

It covered primary research in general and organic chemistry published in chemistry journals. Each record contains a reaction scheme, as well as bibliographic data and a link to the original article on the publisher's website. Subscribers were able to search by topic and reaction type or register for email alerts of new content based on their search preferences.

== History ==
The database was established in 2015 to replace the two discontinued databases Methods in Organic Synthesis (ISSN 0265-4245) and Catalysts and Catalysed Reactions (ISSN 1474-9173.

Methods in Organic Synthesis was an online database that was established in 1998 and updated weekly with the latest developments in organic synthesis. It was also available as a monthly print bulletin.

Catalysts & Catalysed Reactions was a monthly current-awareness journal that was published from 2002 to 2014. It covered the research areas of catalysed reactions and catalysts.
