= Spectroscopy Letters =

- Discipline: Spectroscopy
- Language: English
- Edited by: Robert G. Michel

Publication details
- History: 1968-present
- Publisher: Taylor & Francis
- Frequency: 10/year
- Impact factor: 1.179 (2020)

Standard abbreviations
- ISO 4: Spectrosc. Lett.

Indexing
- ISSN: 0038-7010 (print); 1532-2289 (web)

Links
- Journal homepage; Online access; Online archive

Spectroscopy Letters is a peer-reviewed scientific journal for rapid communications about work on a wide variety of spectroscopic methods covering all aspects of spectroscopy.

== Abstracting and indexing ==
The journal is abstracted and indexed by the Science Citation Index and Current Contents/Physical, Chemical & Earth Sciences.
