= Applied Nanoscience =

- Discipline: Nanoscience, Nanotechnology
- Language: English
- Edited by: Fraser Stoddart (former), Muhammad M. Hussain

Publication details
- History: 2011–present
- Publisher: Springer. (Switzerland)
- Open access: Hybrid

Standard abbreviations
- ISO 4: Appl. Nanosci.

Indexing
- ISSN: 2190-5517

Links
- Journal homepage

Applied Nanoscience is a science journal specializing in nanotechnology and published by Springer Nature. It caters to areas fundamental to building sustainable progress, including water science, advanced materials, energy, electronics, environmental science and medicine.

== Abstracting and indexing ==
According to the information on the journal's web site, in September 2024, Applied Nanoscience was indexed in the following databases:

- Astrophysics Data System (ADS)
- Baidu
- CLOCKSS
- CNKI
- CNPIEC
- Chemical Abstracts Service (CAS)
- Dimensions
- EBSCO
- EI Compendex
- Google Scholar
- INIS Atomindex
- Japanese Science and Technology Agency (JST)
- Naver
- OCLC WorldCat Discovery Service
- Portico
- ProQuest
- SCImago
- SCOPUS
- Semantic Scholar
- TD Net Discovery Service
- UGC-CARE List (India)
- Wanfang

== Controversies ==
In March 2023, Clarivate discontinued the coverage of Applied Nanoscience (along with 81 other journals) in Web of Science. According to Chris Graf, research integrity director at Springer Nature, the publisher was "looking carefully at the journal, utilising the Web of Science criteria as well as evaluating it more holistically, to ensure that it can be relisted at the earliest opportunity."

In January 2024, Retraction Watch covered mass retraction of papers from Applied Nanoscience. The retracted papers had been submitted to various special issues, subsequently raising concerns "including but not limited to compromised editorial handling and peer review process, inappropriate or irrelevant references or not being in scope of the journal or guest-edited issue."
