= Analytica Chimica Acta =

- Discipline: Analytical chemistry
- Language: English

Publication details
- History: 1947–present
- Publisher: Elsevier (Netherlands)
- Frequency: Weekly
- Impact factor: 6.911 (2021)

Standard abbreviations
- ISO 4: Anal. Chim. Acta

Indexing
- CODEN: ACACAM
- ISSN: 0003-2670 (print); 1873-4324 (web)
- OCLC no.: 01716731

Links
- Journal homepage; Online access

Analytica Chimica Acta is a peer-reviewed scientific journal published since 1947 that covers original research and reviews of fundamental and applied aspects of analytical chemistry. The editors-in-chief are Prof. Lutgarde Buydens and Prof. James Landers.

== See also ==
- List of scientific journals in chemistry
- Analytical chemistry
- Chemistry
