= Jahres-Bericht über die Leistungen der chemischen Technologie =

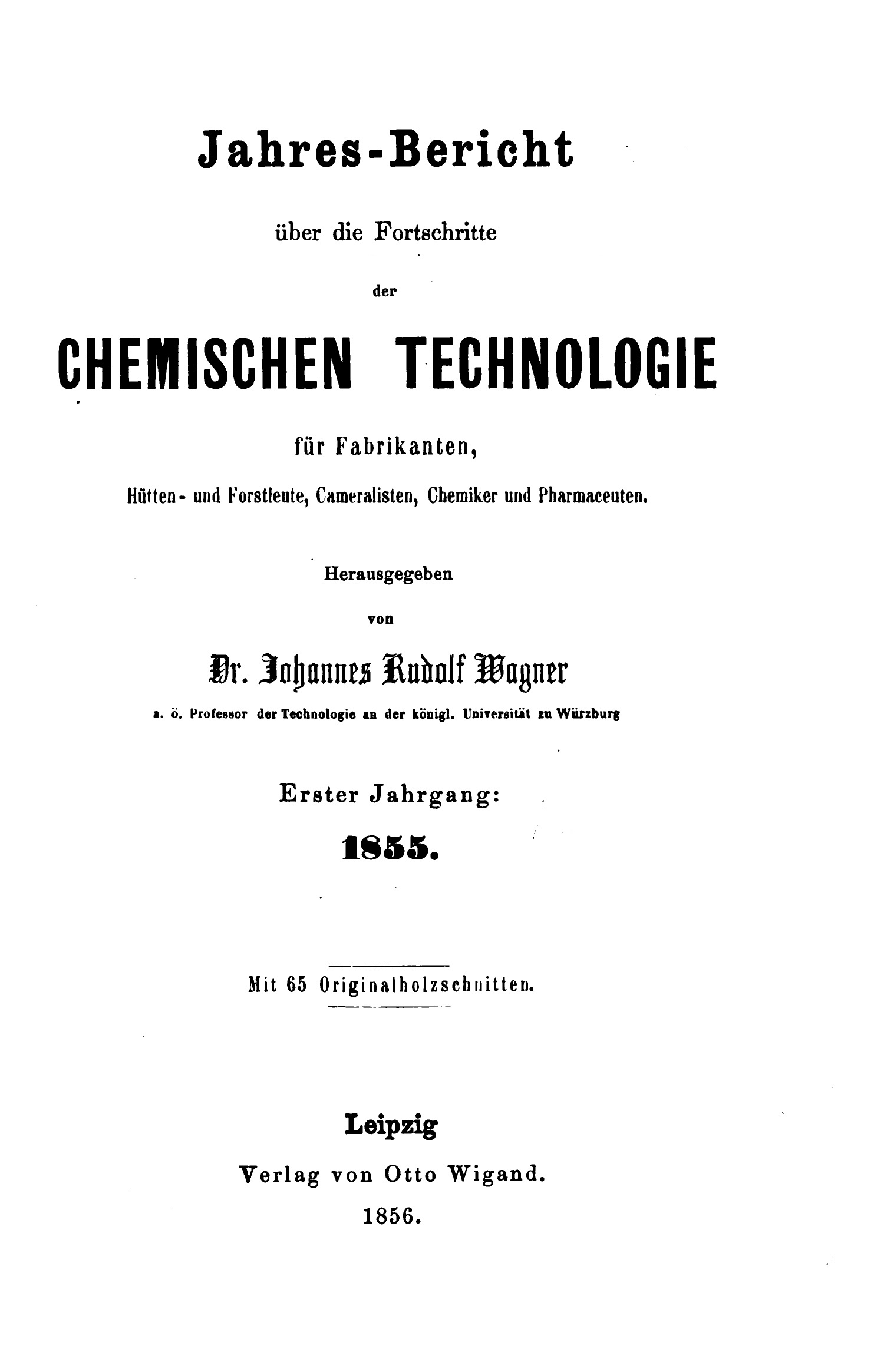
- Cover of the first volume, 1855
- Discipline: Chemistry
- Language: German
- Edited by: Johannes Rudolf von Wagner (1855–1880); Ferdinand Fischer (1880–?)

Publication details
- Former name(s): Jahres-Bericht über die Fortschritte und Leistungen der chemischen Technologie und Technischen Chemie (1859–1864); Jahres-Bericht über die Fortschritte der chemischen Technologie für Fabrikanten, Chemiker, Pharmaceuten, Hütten- und Forstleute und Cameralisten (1855–1858)
- History: 1855–?

Standard abbreviations
- ISO 4: Jahresber. über Leist. chem. Technol.

Indexing
- OCLC no.: 712586073

The Jahres-Bericht über die Leistungen der chemischen Technologie was a German scientific journal on chemistry, pharmacy and metallurgy, published from 1855 to at least 1935.

The journal changed its title several times. From 1855 to 1858 it was published as the Jahres-Bericht über die Fortschritte der chemischen Technologie für Fabrikanten, Chemiker, Pharmaceuten, Hütten- und Forstleute und Cameralisten and from 1859 to 1864 as the Jahres-Bericht über die Fortschritte und Leistungen der chemischen Technologie und technischen Chemie. It was edited by its founder Johannes Rudolf von Wagner until his death in 1880, then by Ferdinand Fischer. It was published by Otto Wigand of Leipzig.
