= Journal of Elastomers and Plastics =

- Discipline: Material science
- Language: English
- Edited by: Heshmat A. Aglan

Publication details
- Former name: Journal of Elastoplastics
- History: 1969-present
- Publisher: SAGE Publications
- Frequency: Bimonthly
- Impact factor: 1.833 (2020)

Standard abbreviations
- ISO 4: J. Elastomers Plast.

Indexing
- CODEN: JEPLAX
- ISSN: 0095-2443 (print); 1530-8006 (web)
- LCCN: 74644802
- OCLC no.: 1794056

Links
- Journal homepage; Online access; Online archive

The Journal of Elastomers and Plastics is a bimonthly peer-reviewed scientific journal that covers materials science of elastomers and plastics. The editor-in-chief is Heshmat A. Aglan (Tuskegee University). It was established in 1969 as the Journal of Elastoplastics, obtaining its current name in 1974. The journal is published by SAGE Publications.

== Abstracting and indexing ==
The journal is abstracted and indexed in Scopus and the Science Citation Index Expanded. According to the Journal Citation Reports, its 2020 impact factor is 1.833, ranking it 257th out of 334 journals in the category "Materials Science, Multidisciplinary" and 68th out of 91 journals in the category "Polymer Science".
