= Revista Boliviana de Química =

- Discipline: Chemistry
- Language: mostly Spanish, some English

Publication details
- History: 1977–present
- Publisher: Facultad de Ciencias Puras y Naturales, Carrera de Química (Bolivia)

Standard abbreviations
- ISO 4: Rev. Boliv. Quím.

Indexing
- CODEN: RBQUDX
- ISSN: 0250-5460

Links
- Journal homepage

The Revista Boliviana de Química (ISSN 0250-5460, CODEN RBQUDX) is a Bolivian scientific journal in chemistry. It was founded in 1977 and is published by the Facultad de Ciencias Puras y Naturales Publicación de la Carrera de Química, Carrera de Química at the Campus Universitario Cota Cota, in La Paz. The journal was not published from 1980 to 1982.

The contents of the journal can be accessed via the Biblioteca Virtual Universitaria hosted at the Universidad Mayor de San Andrés (UMSA).

== See also ==
- Anales de Química
