= Applied Catalysis A: General =

Applied Catalysis A: General is a peer-reviewed scientific journal covering catalytic science and its applications. It is published by Elsevier and its editors-in-chief is Harold Kung.

== Abstracting and indexing ==
The journal is abstracted and indexed in:

- Chemical Abstracts
- COMPENDEX
- Chemical Abstracts
- Current Contents/Engineering, Computing & Technology
- Current Contents/Physics, Chemical, & Earth Sciences
- Engineering, Technology & Applied Sciences
- Metals Abstracts
- Science Citation Index
- Scopus
- Theoretical Chemical Engineering Abstracts

According to the Journal Citation Reports, the journal has a 2020 impact factor of 5.706.
