= Proceedings of the Chemical Society =

- Discipline: Chemistry
- Language: English

Publication details
- History: 1841
- Publisher: Chemical Society (United Kingdom)

Standard abbreviations
- ISO 4: Proc. Chem. Soc.

Indexing
- CODEN: PCSLAW
- ISSN: 0369-8718

Links
- Journal homepage

The Proceedings of the Chemical Society was a scientific journal published at various times in the life of the Chemical Society, a scientific society in the United Kingdom that combined with other societies to form the Royal Society of Chemistry in 1980. In 1841, the Society published Memoirs of the Chemical Society, renamed in 1842 to Proceedings of the Chemical Society. Together these were volume 1. Volumes 2 and 3 were published as Memoirs and Proceedings, Chemical Society, London between 1843 and 1848. The Proceedings of the Chemical Society, London were published from vol. 1, 1885 to vol. 30, 1914 and from 1950 to 1964. Between 1915 and 1956 the Proceedings of the Chemical Society, London were published as a supplement to Journal of the Chemical Society, London.

== See also ==
- Journal of the Chemical Society
- Quarterly Reviews of the Chemical Society
- List of scientific journals in chemistry
