= Open Chemistry =

- Discipline: Chemistry
- Language: English
- Edited by: Joaquín Plumet

Publication details
- Former name: Central European Journal of Chemistry
- History: 2003-present
- Publisher: Walter de Gruyter
- Frequency: Monthly
- Open access: Yes
- License: Creative Commons-BY-NC-ND
- Impact factor: 2.3 (2022)

Standard abbreviations
- ISO 4: Open Chem.

Indexing
- ISSN: 2391-5420
- Central European Journal of Chemistry
- ISSN: 1644-3624 (print); 1895-1066 (web)

Links
- Journal homepage

Open Chemistry is a monthly peer-reviewed open access scientific journal covering all fields of chemistry. It is published by Walter de Gruyter. The editor-in-chief is Joaquín Plumet, (Complutense University).

== History ==
The journal was established in 2003 as the Central European Journal of Chemistry. It was co-published by Springer Science+Business Media and Versita (since 2012 part of Walter de Gruyter). By the end of 2014 the journal was moved completely to De Gruyter, obtaining its current title and switching to full open access.

== Abstracting and indexing ==
The journals is abstracted and indexed in:

- Advanced Polymers Abstracts
- Aluminium Industry Abstracts
- Ceramic Abstracts - World Ceramics Abstracts
- Chemical Abstracts Service
- Computer and Information Systems Abstracts
- Earthquake Engineering Abstracts
- METADEX
- Mechanical & Transportation Engineering Abstracts
- Scopus
- Science Citation Index Expanded
- Solid States and Superconductivity Abstracts

According to the Journal Citation Reports, the journal has a 2022 impact factor of 2.3.
