= Molecular Diversity =

- Discipline: Biochemistry
- Language: English
- Edited by: Hong-yu Li, Kunal Roy

Publication details
- History: 1995-present
- Publisher: Springer Science+Business Media
- Frequency: Quarterly
- Impact factor: 4.3 (2025)

Standard abbreviations
- ISO 4: Mol. Divers.

Indexing
- ISSN: 1381-1991 (print); 1573-501X (web)
- OCLC no.: 605123784

Links
- Journal homepage; Online archive

Molecular Diversity is a quarterly peer-reviewed scientific journal published by Springer Science+Business Media covering research on molecular diversity and combinatorial chemistry in basic and applied research and drug discovery. The journal publishes both short and full-length papers, perspectives, news, and reviews. Coverage addresses the generation of molecular diversity, application of diversity for screening against alternative targets of all types, and the analysis of results and their applications. The journal was established in 1995 and the editors-in-chief are Hong-yu Li and Kunal Roy.

== History ==
The journal ceased publication at the end of 2000, but was revived when starting in 2003 it absorbed Molecular Diversity Preservation International's Journal of Molecular Diversity (ISSN 1424-7917). Shu-Kun Lin served as editor-in-chief and edited volumes 6-11 (2003-2007). He was succeeded by Guillermo A. Morales, who was editor-in-chief until June 2018.

== Abstracting and indexing ==
The journal is abstracted and indexed in:

- Science Citation Index Expanded
- PubMed/MEDLINE
- Scopus
- EMBASE
- Chemical Abstracts Service
- Academic OneFile
- AGRICOLA
- Biological Abstracts
- BIOSIS
- Chemistry Citation Index
- ChemWeb
- Current Contents/Physical, Chemical and Earth Sciences
- VINITI Database RAS

According to the Journal Citation Reports, the journal has a 2025 impact factor of 4.3.
