= ChemInform =

Chemistry indexing and abstracting service

ChemInform was an indexing and abstracting service and database in chemistry. The service published abstracts related to organic, organometallic, inorganic and physical chemistry.

== Products ==
=== ChemInform: Selected Abstracts in Chemistry ===
ChemInform
- Language: English

Publication details
- Former names: Chemischer Informationsdienst: anorganische und physikalische Chemie (1970-1971); Chemischer Informationsdienst: organische Chemie (1970-1971); Chemischer Informationsdienst (1972-1986)
- History: 1970–2016
- Publisher: John Wiley & Sons

Standard abbreviations
- ISO 4: ChemInform

Indexing
- ISSN: 0931-7597 (print); 1522-2667 (web)

Links
- Online access

The abstracts were published in ChemInform: Selected Abstracts in Chemistry from 1970 to 2016. It was originally published in two parts as Chemischer Informationsdienst: anorganische und physikalische Chemie and Chemischer Informationsdienst: organische Chemie, which merged in 1972 into the single Chemischer Informationsdienst, which superseded in part Chemisches Zentralblatt. The publication acquired its final title in 1987. ChemInform was acquired by Wiley from FIZ Chemie Berlin in 2013. In 2016 Wiley terminated ChemInform service without explanation.

=== ChemInform RX ===
A reaction database ChemInform RX (CIRX) enabled users to search for specific reactions published in ChemInform journal.

=== SPORE ===
SPORE (Solid Phase Organic Reactions) was a database for synthetic pathways via polymer-bound organic compounds, with extensive data on each individual reaction.

== See also ==
- Chemical Abstracts Service
