= Annual Reports on the Progress of Chemistry =

- Cover of Series A
- Discipline: Chemistry
- Language: English

Publication details
- History: 1904–2013
- Publisher: Royal Institute of Chemistry (United Kingdom)
- Frequency: Annually

Standard abbreviations
- ISO 4: Annu. Rep. Prog. Chem.

Indexing
- CODEN: (A: CSAAAE; B: CACBB4; C: ACPCDW) ARPCAW (A: CSAAAE; B: CACBB4; C: ACPCDW)
- ISSN: 0365-6217
- LCCN: 07013499
- Series A
- ISSN: 0260-1818 (print); 1460-4760 (web)
- Series B
- ISSN: 0069-3030 (print); 1460-4779 (web)
- Series C
- ISSN: 0260-1826 (print); 1460-4787 (web)

Links
- Journal homepage; Series A; Series B; Series C

Annual Reports on the Progress of Chemistry was a yearly review journal published by the Royal Institute of Chemistry and after 1980 the Royal Society of Chemistry. It was established in 1904. In 1967 the journal was split into two sections, A and B, covering inorganic and organic chemistry, respectively., In 1980, a third series was started, C, covering physical chemistry. The journal was discontinued in 2013.
