= Journal of the Royal Institute of Chemistry =

- Discipline: Chemistry
- Language: English

Publication details
- Former name(s): • Journal and Proceedings of the Royal Institute of Chemistry • Journal and Proceedings of the Royal Institute of Chemistry of Great Britain and Ireland • Journal and Proceedings of the Institute of Chemistry of Great Britain and Ireland • Proceedings of the Institute of Chemistry of Great Britain and Ireland
- History: 1877–present
- Publisher: Royal Society of Chemistry

Standard abbreviations
- ISO 4: J. R. Inst. Chem.

Indexing
- Journal of the Royal Institute of Chemistry
- ISSN: 0368-3958 (print); 2050-9235 (web)
- Journal and Proceedings of the Royal Institute of Chemistry
- ISSN: 2051-1620 (print); 2051-1639 (web)

Links
- Journal homepage

The Journal of the Royal Institute of Chemistry was a scientific journal published by the Royal Institute of Chemistry which combined with other societies in 1980 to form the Royal Society of Chemistry (RSC). It had various names, including those with the title of the Institute prior to gaining its royal charter:-

- Journal of the Royal Institute of Chemistry (1950-1964)
- Journal and Proceedings of the Royal Institute of Chemistry (1949)
- Journal and Proceedings of the Royal Institute of Chemistry of Great Britain and Ireland (1944-1948)
- Journal and Proceedings of the Institute of Chemistry of Great Britain and Ireland (1920-1943)
- Proceedings of the Institute of Chemistry of Great Britain and Ireland (1877-1919)

== See also ==
- Royal Institute of Chemistry Reviews
- List of scientific journals
- List of scientific journals in chemistry
