= Journal of the Chemical Society, Faraday Transactions =

- Discipline: Chemistry
- Language: English
- Edited by: Rosemary Whitelock

Publication details
- Former name(s): Transactions of the Faraday Society; Journal of the Chemical Society, Faraday Transactions I; Journal of the Chemical Society, Faraday Transactions II
- History: 1905–1998
- Publisher: Royal Society of Chemistry (United Kingdom)
- Impact factor: 1.757 (1998)

Standard abbreviations
- ISO 4: J. Chem. Soc. Faraday Trans.

Indexing
- CODEN: JCFTEV
- ISSN: 0956-5000
- LCCN: 90659044
- OCLC no.: 20905692

Links
- Journal homepage

The Journal of the Chemical Society, Faraday Transactions was a peer-reviewed scientific journal published from 1905 until 1998. The journal was originally published by the Faraday Society under the name Transactions of the Faraday Society and was renamed in 1972.

== History ==
The journal began its publication in 1905 as Transactions of the Faraday Society. When the society merged with the other chemistry societies of the United Kingdom to form the Royal Society of Chemistry, the publication of the journal was transferred to the Chemical Society in 1972 as part of the merger negotiations. The journal was renamed Journal of the Chemical Society, Faraday Transactions, and split in two (Faraday Transactions I: Physical Chemistry in Condensed Phases and Faraday Transactions II: Molecular and Chemical Physics). After the merger, the Royal Society carried the publication until its end. In 1990, the two journals merged into a single Journal of the Chemical Society, Faraday Transactions, which continued publication until 1998 when it merged with a number of other physical chemistry journals published by different societies to form Physical Chemistry Chemical Physics.

== See also ==
- Faraday Discussions
- Physical Chemistry Chemical Physics
