= International Symposium on Fluorous Technologies =

ISoFT is the abbreviation for the International Symposium on Fluorous Technologies. This symposium series was founded to discuss recent advances, including commercial applications, of technologies related to fluorous chemistry.

== History ==
- The first meeting of ISoFT was held July 3–6, 2005 in Bordeaux, France. Jean-Marc Vincent and Richard H. Fish organized the first symposium, selected the International Advisory Board, and instituted the Fluorous Technology Award.
- The second meeting of ISoFT was held July 29-August 1, 2007 in Yokohama, Japan. The meeting was chaired by Drs. Junzo Otera and Kenichi Hatanaka.
- The third ISoFT meeting was held in conjunction with the 19th International Symposium on Fluorine Chemistry from August 23–28, 2009 in Jackson Hole, Wyoming.
- The fourth meeting of ISoFT was at the City University of Hong Kong from November 30-December 3, 2011 and was chaired by Dr. István T. Horváth.
- The fifth ISoFT meeting was held from June 2–5, 2013 at Eötvös Loránd University in Budapest, Hungary, and was chaired by József Rábai.
- The sixth ISoFT meeting was held from August 23–28, 2015 at Politecnico di Milano in Como, Italy, as a joint event with 21st International Symposium on Fluorine Chemistry and was chaired by Pierangelo Metrangolo, Giuseppe Resnati and Giancarlo Terraneo.
- The seventh ISoFT meeting was held from August 9-11, 2017 at Tufts University outside Boston, MA, USA and was chaired by Krishna Kumar, Wei Zhang and Vittorio Montari.
- The eighth ISoFT meeting was held from August 8-11, 2019 at Shanghai, China and was chaired by Fanhong Wu.
- The ninth ISoFT meeting was held from July 23-28, 2023 at Quebec City, Canada as a joint event with 23rd International Symposium on Fluorine Chemistry chaired by Chadron Friesen, Michael Gerken, Jean-François Paquin and Gary Schrobilgen.
- The tenth ISoFT meeting will be held from July 25-30, 2027 at Strasbourg, France as a joint event with 25rd International Symposium on Fluorine Chemistry chaired by Frédéric Leroux, Thierry Billard, Vincent Maisonneuve, Emmanuel Magnier and Marie Pierre Krafft.

== Fluorous Technology Award ==
In recognition of major contributions to fluorous chemistry:

- 2005, István T. Horváth (City University of Hong Kong)

József Rábai (Eötvös Loránd University)

- 2007, John A. Gladysz (Texas A&M University)

Dennis P. Curran (University of Pittsburgh)

- 2009, Ilhyong Ryu (Osaka Prefecture University)
- 2011, Gianluca Pozzi (CNR-Istituto di Scienze e Tecnologie Molecolari)
- 2013, Richard H. Fish (Lawrence Berkeley National Laboratory)

Jean-Marc Vincent (University of Bordeaux)

- 2015, Wei Zhang (University of Massachusetts)
- 2017, Nicola Pohl (Indiana University)
- 2019, Pierangelo Metrangolo (Politecnico de Milano)
- 2023, Marie Pierre Krafft (University of Strasbourg (CNRS))
