= Giuseppe Resnati =

Italian chemist

- Born: 26 August 1955 (age 71); Monza, Italy
- Scientific career
- Education: University of Milan
- Known for: halogen bond, chalcogen bond, and pnictogen bond
- Awards: RSC/SCI Lectureship (2010); van der Waals Prize (2021)
- Fields: Supramolecular chemistry; Crystal Engineering; Fluorine chemistry
- Workplaces: Politecnico di Milano; National Research Council (Italy)
- Thesis: Asymmetric Synthesis Via Chiral Sulfoxides (1988)
- Doctoral students: Pierangelo Metrangolo

Giuseppe Resnati (born 26 August 1955) is an Italian chemist with interests in supramolecular chemistry and fluorine chemistry. He has a particular focus on self-assembly processes driven by halogen bonds, chalcogen bonds, and pnictogen bonds. His results on the attractive non-covalent interactions wherein atoms act as electrophiles thanks to the anisotropic distribution of the electron density typical for bonded atoms, prompted a systematic rationalization and categorization of many different weak bonds formed by many elements of the p- and d-blocks of the periodic table.

== Education and professional positions ==
Resnati was born in Monza, Italy. He obtained his PhD in Industrial Chemistry at the University of Milan in 1988 with Prof. Carlo Scolastico and a thesis on asymmetric synthesis via chiral sulfoxides. After a period of activity at the Italian National Research Council, in 2001 he became professor of chemistry for materials at the Politecnico di Milano. Since 2025 he is Emeritus Professor of Chemical Bases for Technologies at the same university.

== Research interests ==
His research interests cover/have covered the following topics:

- enantioselective synthesis of mono- and polyfluorinated compounds and synthesis via perfluorinated reagents (perfluorinated oxaziridines as powerful yet selective oxidizing agents)
- fluorinated contrast agents for magnetic resonance imaging
- intermolecular forces and their use in crystal engineering, supramolecular chemistry, Borromean rings, and self-assembly processes in the design and preparation of functional materials
- halogen bond and iodine chemistry; chalcogen bond.
- green chemistry

== Honors and awards ==
- van der Waals Prize 2021 (awarded in 2022 by the 2nd International Conference on Noncovalent Interactions, ICNI-2022)
- RSC-SCI Award Lectureship in the Chemical Sciences (awarded in 2010 by Royal Society of Chemistry/Società Chimica Italiana)
- Intermolecular Interactions and Structural Aspects in Organic Chemistry Award (awarded in 2008 by Società Chimica Italiana)
- Corrado Fuortes award (awarded in 1986 by Istituto Lombardo Accademia di Scienze e Lettere)
- Invited professor at the University of Strasbourg (2012, Strasbourg, France)
- Invited professor at the Nagoya University (2001, Nagoya, Japan)
- Invited professor at the Paris-Sud University (1996, Châtenay-Malabry, France)
- Senior NATO Fellowship (1989-1990, Clemson University, SC, USA)
- Member of the Academia Europaea (since 2012)
- Member of the International Advisory Board of the Journal of Fluorine Chemistry (Elsevier, 2001-2023); of Crystals (MDPI, 2015 onwards); of Sustainable Chemistry & Pharmacy (Elsevier, 2017-2019)
- Topic Editor of Crystal Growth & Design (ACS) (2012 onwards)
- Member of the International Steering Committee of the: -International Conference on Noncovalent Intereactions (ICNI) from ICNI-1 (Lisbon, Portugal; 2019) onwards; -International Symposium on Fluorine Chemistry (ISFC) from ISFC-15 (Vancouver, Canada; 1997) to ISFC-24 (Shanghai, China; 2024); -International Meeting on Halogen Chemistry (HalChem) from Halchem-V (Cagliari, Italy; 2010) onwards; -European Symposium on Fluorine Chemistry (ESFC) from ESFC-11 (Bled, Slovenia; 1995) onwards; -International Symposium on Halogen Bonding (ISXB) from ISXB-1 (Porto Cesareo, Lecce, Italy; 2014) onwards
- Chair of the: -21st International Symposium on Fluorine Chemistry (23-28 August 2015, Como, Italy); -1st International Symposium on Halogen Bonding (ISXB-1)(18-22 June 2014, Porto Cesareo, Lecce, Italy)
- Member of the National Organizing Committee of the 6th International IUPAC Conference on Green Chemistry (4-8 September 2016, Venice, Italy); member of the International Scientific Committee of the 2nd Green & Sustainable Chemistry Conference, 14–17 May 2017, Berlin, Germany; member of the Committee of the Faraday Discussion "Halogen Bonding in Supramolecular and Solid State Chemistry", 10–12 July 2017, Ottawa, Canada
- Coordinator of the UNESCO UNITWIN Network “GREENOMIcS - Green Chemistry Excellence from the Baltic See to the Mediterranean See and Beyond” (2017–2021)
- President of the Rotary Club Rozzano Parco Sud in the rotarian year 2006-'07; assistant of the Governor of the District 2050 (south Lombardy) from 2009 to 2013; advisor of District 2050 Governor for starting Rotary Club Morimondo Abbazia (2012), Club charter member (2013) and president (2015–16)
- Knight of Magistral Grace of the Sovereign Military Order of Malta (2022)
- Knight Commander with Star of the Equestrian Order of the Holy Sepulchre of Jerusalem (2025)
- Knight of Merit with Silver Star of the Sacred Military Constantinian Order of Saint George (2020); Grand Officer of the Order of Saints Maurice and Lazarus (2022); Knight of the Order of Prince Danilo I (2022).
