= International Union of Pure and Applied Chemistry =

NGO enabling communication about chemistry

- Abbreviation: IUPAC
- Formation: 1919; 107 years ago
- Type: International non-governmental organization; standards organization
- Headquarters: Research Triangle Park, North Carolina, United States
- Region served: Worldwide
- Official language: English
- President: Mary Garson
- Vice President: Christine Luscombe
- Secretary General: Zoltán Mester
- Affiliations: International Science Council
- Website: iupac.org

The International Union of Pure and Applied Chemistry (IUPAC /ˈaɪjuːpæk, ˈjuː-/) is an international federation of National Adhering Organizations working for the advancement of the chemical sciences, especially by developing nomenclature and terminology. It is a member of the International Science Council (ISC). IUPAC is registered in Zürich, Switzerland, and its administrative office, known as the "IUPAC Secretariat", is in Research Triangle Park, North Carolina, United States.

IUPAC was established in 1919 as the successor of the International Congress of Applied Chemistry for the advancement of chemistry. Its members, the National Adhering Organizations, can be national chemistry societies, national academies of sciences, or just other bodies representing chemists. There are a total of fifty-four National Adhering Organizations and three Associate National Adhering Organizations. IUPAC's Inter-divisional Committee on Nomenclature and Symbols (IUPAC nomenclature) is the recognized world authority in developing standards for naming chemical elements and compounds. Since its creation, IUPAC has been run by many different committees with different responsibilities. These committees run different projects; of those which include standardizing nomenclature, finding ways to bring chemistry to the world, and publishing works.

IUPAC is best known for its works standardizing nomenclature in chemistry, but they have publications in many science fields including chemistry, biology, and physics. Some important work IUPAC has done in these fields includes standardizing nucleotide base sequence code names; publishing books for environmental scientists, chemists, and physicists; and improving education in science. IUPAC is also known for standardizing the atomic weights of the elements through one of its oldest standing committees, the Commission on Isotopic Abundances and Atomic Weights (CIAAW).

== Creation and history ==
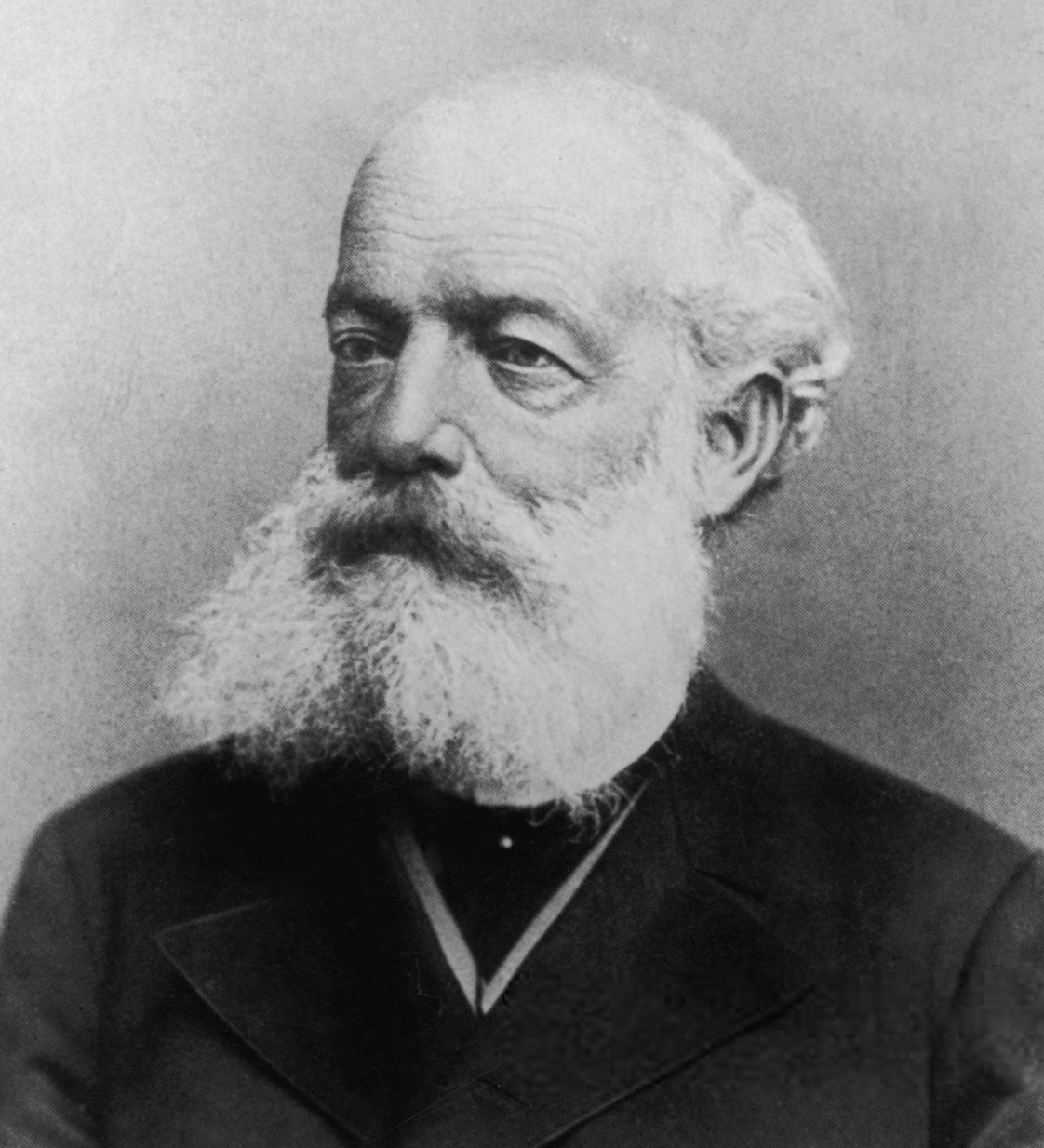
Friedrich August Kekulé von Stradonitz

The need for an international standard for chemistry was first addressed in 1860 by a committee headed by German scientist Friedrich August Kekulé von Stradonitz. This committee was the first international conference to create an international naming system for organic compounds. The ideas that were formulated at that conference evolved into the official IUPAC nomenclature of organic chemistry. IUPAC is a legacy of this meeting, making it one of the most important historical international collaborations of chemistry societies. IUPAC as such was established in 1919.Since this time, IUPAC has been the official organization with the responsibility of updating and maintaining official organic nomenclature.

One notable country excluded from early IUPAC was Germany. Germany's exclusion was a result of prejudice towards it by the Allied powers after World War I. Germany was finally admitted into IUPAC in 1929. However, Nazi Germany was removed from IUPAC during World War II. At this time, IUPAC was affiliated with the Allied powers, but had little involvement with the war effort itself. East and West Germany were only readmitted to IUPAC in 1973. Since World War II, IUPAC has focused on standardizing nomenclature and methods in science.

In 2016, IUPAC denounced the use of chlorine as a chemical weapon. In a letter to Ahmet Üzümcü, director of the Organisation for the Prohibition of Chemical Weapons (OPCW), the organization pointed out their concerns in regards to chlorine weapon usage in the Syrian civil war and other places . The letter stated, "Our organizations deplore the use of chlorine in this manner. The indiscriminate attacks, possibly carried out by a member state of the Chemical Weapons Convention (CWC), are of concern to chemical scientists and engineers around the globe and we stand ready to support your mission of implementing the CWC." According to the CWC, "the use, stockpiling, distribution, development or storage of any chemical weapons is forbidden by any of the 192 state party signatories."

== Committees and governance ==
IUPAC is governed by several committees that all have different responsibilities. The committees are as follows: Bureau, CHEMRAWN (Chem Research Applied to World Needs) Committee, Committee on Chemistry Education, Committee on Chemistry and Industry, Committee on Printed and Electronic Publications, Evaluation Committee, Executive Committee, Finance Committee, Interdivisional Committee on Terminology, Nomenclature and Symbols, Project Committee, and Pure and Applied Chemistry Editorial Advisory Board. Each committee is made up of members of different National Adhering Organizations from different countries.

The steering committee hierarchy for IUPAC is as follows:

- All committees have an allotted budget to which they must adhere.
- Any committee may start a project.
- If a project's spending becomes too much for a committee to continue funding, it must take the issue to the Project Committee.
- The project committee either increases the budget or decides on an external funding plan.
- The Bureau and Executive Committee oversee operations of the other committees.

IUPAC committees
Committee name (abbreviation)	Responsibilities
Bureau	Discussing and making changes to which committee has authority over a specific project; Controlling finances for all other committees and IUPAC as a whole; Discussing general governance of IUPAC
Physical and Biophysical Chemistry Division (Division I)	Organizing and promoting the international collaboration between scientists in physical and biophysical chemistry and related fields
Inorganic Chemistry Division (Division II)	Inorganic and inorganic materials chemistry, isotopes, and atomic weights, periodic table
Organic and Biomolecular Chemistry Division (Division III)	Promoting the goals of IUPAC in the field of organic and biomolecular chemistry in the broadest sense
Polymer Division (Division IV)	The science and technology of macromolecules and polymers
Analytical Chemistry Division (Division V)	The general aspects of analytical chemistry, separation methods, spectrochemical methods, electrochemical methods, nuclear chemistry methods, and applications to human health and the environment.
Chemistry and the Environment Division (Division VI)	Providing unbiased and timely authoritative reviews on the behavior of chemical compounds in food and the environment.
Chemistry and Human Health Division (Division VII)	Medicinal and clinical chemistry
Chemical Nomenclature and Structure Representation Division (Division VIII)	Maintaining and developing standard systems for designating chemical structures, including both conventional nomenclature and computer-based systems.
CHEMRAWN Committee (Chem Research Applied to World Needs)	Discussing different ways chemistry can and should be used to help the world
Committee on Chemistry Education (CCE)	Coordinating IUPAC chemistry research with the educational systems of the world
Committee on Chemistry and Industry (COCI)	Coordinating IUPAC chemistry research with industrial chemistry needs
Committee on Ethics, Diversity, Equity and Inclusion (CEDEI)	Promoting and developing the core values stated in the IUPAC strategic plan
Committee on Publications and Cheminformatics Data Standards (CPCDS)	Designing and implementing IUPAC publications; Heading the Subcommittee on Spectroscopic Data Standards
Evaluation Committee (EvC)	Evaluating every project; Reporting back to the Executive Committee on every project
Executive Committee (EC)	Planning and discussing IUPAC events; Discussing IUPAC fundraising; Reviewing other committees' work; Current officers of the Executive Committee: President: García Martínez, Javier; Vice president: Keinan, Ehud; Past President: Brett, Christopher M. A.; Treasurer: Koch, Wolfram; Secretary General: Hartshorn, Richard M.
Finance Committee (FC)	Helping other committees properly manage their budgets; Advising union officers on investments
Interdivisional Committee on Green Chemistry for Sustainable Development (ICGCSD)	Advancing IUPAC Strategic Plan for green and sustainable chemistry; Coordinating all the work of IUPAC in this area to develop a coherent program of action; Initiating and coordinating projects in green and sustainable chemistry; Encouraging activities in these areas from across the Divisions and Standing Committees; Harmonization, regulation, and standardization in green and sustainable chemistry; Organizing the series of IUPAC International Conferences on Green Chemistry; Managing IUPAC participation in the PhosAgro/UNESCO/IUPAC Green Chemistry for Life awards program; Managing the Green Chemistry Postgraduate Summer School series; Managing IUPAC CHEMRAWN Prize for Green Chemistry; Working and collaborating with other international organizations and industries; Seeking additional sponsorship and support from industrial sources
Interdivisional Committee on Terminology (ICTNS)	Managing IUPAC nomenclature; Working through many projects to standardize nomenclature; Standardizing measurements; Discussing atomic weight standardization
Project Committee (PC)	Managing funds that are under the jurisdiction of multiple projects; Judging if a project is too large for its funding; Recommending sources of external funding for projects; Deciding how to fund meetings in developing countries and countries in crisis
Pure and Applied Chemistry Editorial Advisory Board (PAC-EAB)	Helping to plan, implement, and publish Pure and Applied Chemistry

== Nomenclature ==
Scientists framed a systematic method for naming organic compounds based on their structures. Hence, the naming rules were formulated by IUPAC.

=== Basic spellings ===
IUPAC establishes rules for harmonized spelling of some chemicals to reduce variation among different local English-language variants. For example, they recommend "aluminium" rather than "aluminum", "sulfur" rather than "sulphur", and "caesium" rather than "cesium".

=== Organic nomenclature ===
IUPAC organic nomenclature has three main parts: the substituents, carbon chain length, and chemical affix. The substituents are any functional groups tied to the main carbon chain. The main carbon chain is the longest possible continuous chain. The chemical affix denotes what type of molecule it is. For example, the ending ane conveys a single bonded carbon chain, as in "hexane" (C_{6}H_{14}).

Another example of IUPAC organic nomenclature is cyclohexanol:

Cyclohexanol

- The substituent name for a ring compound is cyclo.
- The indication (substituent name) for a six carbon chain is hex.
- The chemical ending for a single bonded carbon chain is ane.
- The chemical ending for an alcohol is ol.
- The two chemical endings are combined for an ending of anol indicating a single bonded carbon chain with an alcohol attached to it.

=== Inorganic nomenclature ===
Basic IUPAC inorganic nomenclature has two main parts: the cation and the anion. The cation is the name for the positively charged ion and the anion is the name for the negatively charged ion.

An example of IUPAC nomenclature of inorganic chemistry is potassium chlorate (KClO_{3}):

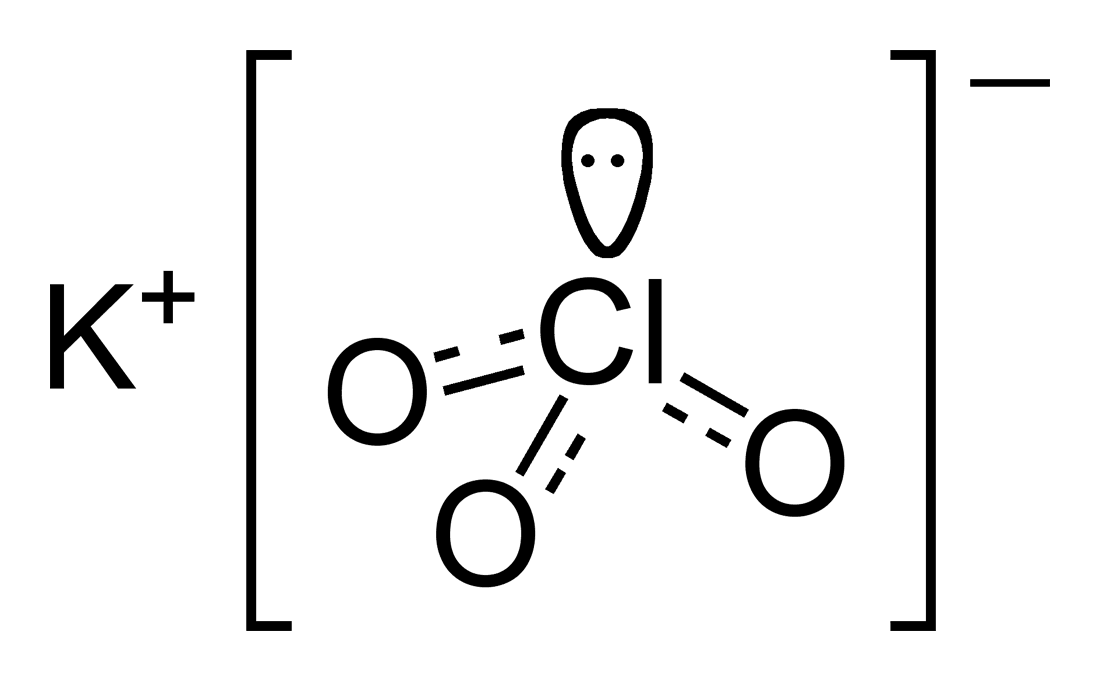
Potassium chlorate

- "Potassium" is the cation name.
- "Chlorate" is the anion name.

== Amino acid and nucleotide base codes ==
IUPAC also has a system for giving codes to identify amino acids and nucleotide bases. It needed a coding system that represented long sequences of amino acids. This would allow for these sequences to be compared to try to find homologies. These codes can consist of either a one-letter code, or a three-letter code.

These codes make it easier and shorter to write down the amino acid sequences that make up proteins. The nucleotide bases are made up of purines (adenine and guanine) and pyrimidines (cytosine and thymine or uracil). These nucleotide bases make up DNA and RNA. And they make the genome of an organism much smaller and easier to read.

Nucleic acid code	Meaning	Reasoning
A	A	Adenine
C	C	Cytosine
G	G	Guanine
T	T	Thymine
U	U	Uracil
R	A or G	Purine
Y	C, T or U	Pyrimidines
K	G, T or U	Bases that are ketones
M	A or C	Bases with amino groups
S	C or G	Strong interaction
W	A, T, or U	Weak interaction
B	Not A (i.e. C, G, T, or U)	B comes after A
D	Not C (i.e. A, G, T, or U)	D comes after C
H	Not G (i.e., A, C, T, or U)	H comes after G
V	Neither T nor U (i.e. A, C, or G)	V comes after U
N	A C G T U	Nucleic acid
X	Masked	
-	Gap of indeterminate length	

The codes for amino acids (22 amino acids and six special codes) are:

Amino acid code	Meaning
A	Alanine
B	Aspartic acid or asparagine
C	Cysteine
D	Aspartic acid
E	Glutamic acid
F	Phenylalanine
G	Glycine
H	Histidine
I	Isoleucine
K	Lysine
L	Leucine
M	Methionine
N	Asparagine
O	Pyrrolysine
P	Proline
Q	Glutamine
R	Arginine
S	Serine
T	Threonine
U	Selenocysteine
V	Valine
W	Tryptophan
Y	Tyrosine
Z	Glutamic acid or glutamine
J	Leucine or isoleucine
X	Any
*	Translation stop
-	Gap of indeterminate length

== Publications ==
=== Non-series books ===
Book name	Description
Principles and Practices of Method Validation	Principles and Practices of Method Validation is a book entailing methods of validating and analysing many analytes taken from a single aliquot. Also, this book goes over techniques for analysing many samples at once. Some methods discussed include chromatographic methods, estimation of effects, matrix-induced effects, and the effect of an equipment setup on an experiment.
Fundamental Toxicology	Fundamental Toxicology is a textbook that proposes a curriculum for toxicology courses. Fundamental Toxicology is based on the book Fundamental Toxicology for Chemists. Fundamental Toxicology is enhanced through many revisions and updates. New information added in the revisions includes: risk assessment and management; reproductive toxicology; behavioral toxicology; and ecotoxicology. This book is relatively well received as being useful for reviewing chemical toxicology.
Macromolecular Symposia	Macromolecular Symposia is a journal that publishes fourteen issues a year. This journal includes contributions to the macromolecular chemistry and physics field. The meetings of IUPAC are included in this journal along with the European Polymer Federation, the American Chemical Society, and the Society of Polymer Science in Japan.

=== Experimental Thermodynamics book series ===
The Experimental Thermodynamics books series covers many topics in the fields of thermodynamics.

Book	Description
Measurement of the Transport Properties of Fluids	Measurement of the Transport Properties of Fluids is a book that is published by Blackwell Science. The topics that are included in this book are low and high-temperature measurements, secondary coefficients, diffusion coefficients, light scattering, transient methods for thermal conductivity, methods for thermal conductivity, falling-body viscometers, and vibrating viscometers.
Solution Calorimetry	Solution Calorimetry is a book that gives background information on thermal analysis and calorimetry. Thermoanalytical and calorimetric techniques along with thermodynamic and kinetic properties are also discussed. Later volumes of this book discuss the applications and principles of these thermodynamic and kinetic methods.
Equations of State for Fluids and Fluid Mixtures Part I	Equations of State for Fluids and Fluid Mixtures Part I is a book that gives up to date equations of state for fluids and fluid mixtures. This book covers all ways to develop equations of state. It gives the strengths and weaknesses of each equation. Some equations discussed include: virial equation of state cubic equations; generalized Van der Waals equations; integral equations; perturbation theory; and stating and mixing rules. Other things that Equations of State for Fluids and Fluid Mixtures Part I goes over are: associating fluids, polymer systems, polydisperse fluids, self-assembled systems, ionic fluids, and fluids near their critical points.
Measurement of the Thermodynamic Properties of Single Phases	Measurement of the Thermodynamic Properties of Single Phases is a book that gives an overview of techniques for measuring the thermodynamic quantities of single phases. It also goes into experimental techniques to test many different thermodynamic states precisely and accurately. Measurement of the Thermodynamic Properties of Single Phases was written for people interested in measuring thermodynamic properties.
Measurement of the Thermodynamic Properties of Multiple Phases	Measurement of the Thermodynamic Properties of Multiple Phases is a book that includes multiple techniques that are used to study multiple phases of pure component systems. Also included in this book are the measurement techniques to obtain activity coefficients, interfacial tension, and critical parameters. This book was written for researchers and graduate students as a reference source.

=== Series of books on analytical and physical chemistry of environmental systems ===
Book name	Description
Atmospheric Particles	Atmospheric Particles is a book that delves into aerosol science. This book is aimed as a reference for graduate students and atmospheric researchers. Atmospheric Particles goes into depth on the properties of aerosols in the atmosphere and their effect. Topics covered in this book are: acid rain; heavy metal pollution; global warming; and photochemical smog. Atmospheric Particles also covers techniques to analyse the atmosphere and ways to take atmospheric samples.
Environmental Colloids and Particles: Behaviour, Separation and Characterisation	Environmental Colloids and Particles: Behaviour, Separation and Characterisation is a book that discusses environmental colloids and current information available on them. This book focuses on environmental colloids and particles in aquatic systems and soils. It also goes over techniques such as techniques for sampling environmental colloids, size fractionation, and how to characterize colloids and particles. Environmental Colloids and Particles: Behaviour, Separation and Characterisation also delves into how these colloids and particles interact.
Biophysical Chemistry of Fractal Structures and Processes in Environmental Systems	Biophysical Chemistry of Fractal Structures and Processes in Environmental Systems is meant to give an overview of a technique based on fractal geometry and the processes of environmental systems. This book gives ideas on how to use fractal geometry to compare and contrast different ecosystems. It also gives an overview of the knowledge needed to solve environmental problems. Finally, Biophysical Chemistry of Fractal Structures and Processes in Environmental Systems shows how to use the fractal approach to understand the reactivity of flocs, sediments, soils, microorganisms, and humic substances.
Interactions Between Soil Particles and Microorganisms: Impact on the Terrestrial Ecosystem	Interactions Between Soil Particles and Microorganisms: Impact on the Terrestrial Ecosystem is meant to be read by chemists and biologists that study environmental systems. Also, this book should be used as a reference for earth scientists, environmental geologists, environmental engineers, and professionals in microbiology and ecology. Interactions Between Soil Particles and Microorganisms: Impact on the Terrestrial Ecosystem is about how minerals, microorganisms, and organic components work together to affect terrestrial systems. This book identifies that there are many different techniques and theories about minerals, microorganisms, and organic components individually, but they are not often associated with each other. It further goes on to discuss how these components of soil work together to affect terrestrial life. Interactions Between Soil Particles and Microorganisms: Impact on the Terrestrial Ecosystem gives techniques to analyse minerals, microorganisms, and organic components together. This book also has a large section positing why environmental scientists working in the specific fields of minerals, microorganisms, and organic components of soil should work together and how they should do so.
The Biogeochemistry of Iron in Seawater	The Biogeochemistry of Iron in Seawater is a book that describes how low concentrations of iron in Antarctica and the Pacific Ocean are a result of reduced chlorophyll for phytoplankton production. It does this by reviewing information from research in the 1990s. This book goes into depth about: chemical speciation; analytical techniques; transformation of iron; how iron limits the development of high nutrient low chlorophyll areas in the Pacific Ocean.
In Situ Monitoring of Aquatic Systems: Chemical Analysis and Speciation	In Situ Monitoring of Aquatic Systems: Chemical Analysis and Speciation is a book that discusses techniques and devices to monitor aquatic systems and how new devices and techniques can be developed. This book emphasizes the future use of micro-analytical monitoring techniques and microtechnology. In Situ Monitoring of Aquatic Systems: Chemical Analysis and Speciation is aimed at researchers and laboratories that analyse aquatic systems such as rivers, lakes, and oceans.
Structure and Surface Reactions of Soil Particles	Structure and Surface Reactions of Soil Particles is a book about soil structures and the molecular processes that occur in soil. Structure and Surface Reactions of Soil Particles is aimed at any researcher researching soil or in the field of anthropology. It goes into depth on topics such as: fractal analysis of particle dimensions; computer modelling of the structure; reactivity of humics; applications of atomic force microscopy; and advanced instrumentation for analysis of soil particles.
Metal Speciation and Bioavailability in Aquatic Systems, Series on Analytical and Physical Chemistry of Environmental Systems Vol. 3	Metal Speciation and Bioavailability in Aquatic Systems, Series on Analytical and Physical Chemistry of Environmental Systems Vol. 3 is a book about the effect of trace metals on aquatic life. This book is considered a specialty book for researchers interested in observing the effect of trace metals in the water supply. This book includes techniques to assess how bioassays can be used to evaluate how an organism is affected by trace metals. Also, Metal Speciation and Bioavailability in Aquatic Systems, Series on Analytical and Physical Chemistry of Environmental Systems Vol. 3 looks at the limitations of the use of bioassays to observe the effects of trace metals on organisms.
Physicochemical Kinetics and Transport at Biointerfaces	Physicochemical Kinetics and Transport at Biointerfaces is a book created to aid environmental scientists in fieldwork. The book gives an overview of chemical mechanisms, transport, kinetics, and interactions that occur in environmental systems. Physicochemical Kinetics and Transport at Biointerfaces continues from where Metal Speciation and Bioavailability in Aquatic Systems leaves off.

=== Coloured cover book and website series (nomenclature) ===
IUPAC colour code their books in order to make each publication distinguishable.

Title	Description
Compendium of Analytical Nomenclature	One extensive book on almost all nomenclature written (IUPAC nomenclature of organic chemistry and IUPAC nomenclature of inorganic chemistry) by IUPAC committee is the Compendium of Analytical Nomenclature (the "Orange Book"; 1st edition 1978). This book was revised in 1987. The second edition has many revisions that come from reports on nomenclature between 1976 and 1984. In 1992, the second edition went through many different revisions, which led to the third edition.
Pure and Applied Chemistry (journal)	Pure and Applied Chemistry is the official monthly journal of IUPAC. This journal debuted in 1960. The goal statement for Pure and Applied Chemistry is to "publish highly topical and credible works at the forefront of all aspects of pure and applied chemistry." The journal itself is available by subscription, but older issues are available in the archive on IUPAC's website. Pure and Applied Chemistry was created as a central way to publish IUPAC endorsed articles. Before its creation, IUPAC did not have a quick, official way to distribute new chemistry information. Its creation was first suggested at the Paris IUPAC Meeting of 1957. During this meeting the commercial publisher of the journal was discussed and decided on. In 1959, the IUPAC Pure and Applied Chemistry Editorial Advisory Board was created and put in charge of the journal. The idea of one journal being a definitive place for a vast amount of chemistry was difficult for the committee to grasp at first. However, it was decided that the journal would reprint old journal editions to keep all chemistry knowledge available.
Compendium of Chemical Terminology	The Compendium of Chemical Terminology, also known as the "Gold Book", was originally worked on by Victor Gold. This book is a collection of names and terms already discussed in Pure and Applied Chemistry. The Compendium of Chemical Terminology was first published in 1987. The first edition of this book contains no original material, but is meant to be a compilation of other IUPAC works. The second edition of this book was published in 1997. This book made large changes to the first edition of the Compendium of Chemical Terminology. These changes included updated material and an expansion of the book to include over seven thousand terms. The second edition was the topic of an IUPAC XML project. This project made an XML version of the book that includes over seven thousand terms. The XML version of the book includes an open editing policy, which allows users to add excerpts of the written version.
IUPAC Nomenclature of Organic Chemistry (online publication)	IUPAC Nomenclature of Organic Chemistry, also known as the "Blue Book", is a website published by the Advanced Chemistry Department Incorporated with the permission of IUPAC. This site is a compilation of the books A Guide to IUPAC Nomenclature of Organic Compounds and Nomenclature of Organic Chemistry.

== International Year of Chemistry ==
International Year of Chemistry logo

IUPAC and UNESCO were the lead organizations coordinating events for the International Year of Chemistry, which took place in 2011. The International Year of Chemistry was originally proposed by IUPAC at the general assembly in Turin, Italy. This motion was adopted by UNESCO at a meeting in 2008. The main objectives of the International Year of Chemistry were to increase public appreciation of chemistry and gain more interest in the world of chemistry. This event is also being held to encourage young people to get involved and contribute to chemistry. A further reason for this event being held is to honour how chemistry has made improvements to everyone's way of life.

== IUPAC Presidents ==
IUPAC Presidents are elected by the IUPAC Council during the General Assembly. Below is the list of IUPAC Presidents since its inception in 1919.

Term	President	Nationality
1920–1922	Charles Moureu	France
1923–1925	William Jackson Pope	United Kingdom
1926–1928	Ernst Julius Cohen	Netherlands
1928–1934	Einar Biilman	Denmark
1934–1938	Nicola Parravano	Italy
1938–1947	Marston Taylor Bogert	United States
1947–1951	Hugo Rudolph Kruyt	Netherlands
1951–1955	Arne Tiselius	Sweden
1955–1959	Arthur Stoll	Switzerland
1959–1963	William Albert Noyes Jr.	United States
1963–1965	Lord Todd	United Kingdom
1965–1967	Wilhelm Klemm	Germany
1967–1969	V.N. Kondratiev	Soviet Union
1969–1971	Albert Lloyd George Rees	Australia
1971–1973	Jacques Bénard	France
1973–1975	Sir Harold Thompson	United Kingdom
1975–1977	Robert W. Cairns	United States
1977–1979	Georges Smets	Belgium
1979–1981	Heinrich Zollinger	Switzerland
1981–1983	Saburo Nagakura	Japan
1983–1985	William G. Schneider	Canada
1985–1987	C. N. R. Rao	India
1987–1989	Valentin A. Koptyug	Soviet Union
1989–1991	Yves P. Jeannin	France
1991–1993	Allen J. Bard	United States
1993–1995	Kiril I. Zamaraev	Russia
1996–1997	Albert E. Fischli	Switzerland
1998–1999	Joshua Jortner	Israel
2000–2001	Alan Hayes	United Kingdom
2002–2003	Pieter Streicher Steyn	South Africa
2004–2005	Leiv Kristen Sydnes	Norway
2006–2007	Bryan Henry	Canada
2008–2009	Jung-Il Jin	South Korea
2010–2011	Nicole J. Moreau	France
2012–2013	Kazuyuki Tatsumi	Japan
2014–2015	Mark Cesa	United States
2016–2017	Natalia Tarasova	Russia
2018–2019	Zhou Qifeng	China
2020–2021	Christopher M.A. Brett	Portugal
2022–2023	Javier García-Martínez	Spain
2024–2025	Ehud Keinan	Israel
2026–Current	Mary Garson	Australia

== See also ==
- CAS registry number – Chemical identifier
- Chemical nomenclature – Systematic naming of chemical compounds
- Commission on Isotopic Abundances and Atomic Weights – International scientific committee
- European Association for Chemical and Molecular Sciences
- Institute for Reference Materials and Measurements (IRMM) – Promotes a common European measurement system
- International Chemical Identifier (InChI) – Identifier for chemical substances
- International Union of Biochemistry and Molecular Biology (IUBMB) – International non-governmental organization
- International Union of Pure and Applied Physics (IUPAP) – Non-governmental organization for physics development
- List of chemical elements naming controversies
- National Institute of Standards and Technology (NIST) – Measurement standards laboratory in the United States
- Simplified molecular-input line-entry system (SMILES) – Chemical species structure notation
