= European Symposium on Fluorine Chemistry =

The European Symposium on Fluorine Chemistry (ESFC) is a triennial academic conference on Fluorine chemistry founded in 1965. The conference is held in Europe, but traditionally it brings together the fluorine community from all over the world. The scientific programme of the Symposium covers all the areas of fluorine chemistry relevant to fundamental and applied research.

== History ==
The abstracts of 9th ESFC and 10th ESFC appeared as a special issue of the Journal of Fluorine Chemistry, a reference journal in the field; fluorine chemists Herbert W. Roesky and Giuseppe Resnati gave an invited lectures at the 18th ESFC (Kyiv, 2016); the Book of Abstracts of 18th ESFC can be tracked by its ISBN.

== List of symposia ==
N.	Year	City	Country	Period	Chair(s)	Website
1	1965	Munich	West Germany	30 August – 2 September	Friedrich Weygand	
2	1968	Göttingen	West Germany	28–31 September	Oskar Glemser	
3	1970	Aix-en-Provence	France	September	Paul Hagenmuller	
4	1972	Ljubljana	Yugoslavia	28 August – 1 September	Jože Slivnik	
5	1974	Aviemore	United Kingdom	16–19 September	David Sharp	
6	1977	Dortmund	West Germany	28 March – 1 April	Martin Schmeiser	
7	1980	Venice	Italy	15–19 September	Giampaolo Gambaretto	
8	1983	Jerusalem	Israel	21–26 August	Henry Selig	
9	1989	Leicester	United Kingdom	4–8 September	Raymond D. Peacock	
10	1992	Padua	Italy	20–25 September	GianPaolo Gambaretto	
11	1995	Bled	Slovenia	17–22 September	Boris Žemva	
12	1998	Berlin	Germany	29 August – 2 September	Konrad Seppelt, Dieter Lentz	
13	2001	Bordeaux	France	15–20 July	Alain Tressaud	
14	2004	Poznań	Poland	11–16 July	Henryk Koroniak	
15	2007	Prague	Czech Republic	15–20 July	Oldrich Paleta	
16	2010	Ljubljana	Slovenia	18–23 July	Tomaž Skapin, Melita Tramšek, Boris Žemva	website
17	2013	Paris	France	21–25 July	Henri Groult, Bruno Amédur, Alain Tressaud	website
18	2016	Kyiv	Ukraine	7–12 August	Valeriy Kukhar, Yuriy Shermolovich, Yurii Yagupolskii	website
19	2019	Warsaw	Poland	25–31 August	Wojciech Grochala, Henryk Koroniak (honor.)	website
20	2022	Berlin	Germany	14–19 August	Thomas Braun, Sebastian Hasenstab-Riedel, Erhard Kemnitz, Mike Ahrens	website
21	2025	Lisbon	Portugal	3–9 August		
