= International Symposium on Fluorine Chemistry =

The International Symposium on Fluorine Chemistry (ISFC) is an academic conference where researchers present their most recent original results on the chemistry of fluorine and its derivatives. Communications deal with all compounds of fluorine, from hydrogen fluoride to fluoropolymers and other fluorocarbons. Participants to editions from 18th ISFC onwards have been nearly 500, most of them were from academia, researchers from fluorochemical industry being the second largest group.

== History ==
On 14 – 17 July 1959, Colin J. Tatlow organized in Birmingham (UK) an event which was "a milestone in fluorine chemistry", namely he arranged “an International Symposium on Fluorine Chemistry, which became the first of the now regular and important familiar series”. After the 8th ISFC, held in Kyoto (Japan) on 22 – 27 August 1976, ISFCs were systematically organized every three years under the governance of an International Steering Committee. From the very beginning ISFCs were reference events for scientists involved in fluorine chemistry and they played a major role in framing and maintaining the community of fluorine chemists. Some emblematic confirmations of this roles are: results presented at the 1st ISFC (Birmingham, 1959) are cited in a Houben-Weyl volume on fluorine chemistry published in 1999, results presented at the 4th ISFC (Estes Park, 1967) are mentioned in a book on the chemistry and technology of lubricants published in 2013, the Moissan Prize is the most prestigious prize in fluorine chemistry and is presented at ISFCs.

George A. Olah, Nobel Prize in Chemistry winner in 1994, gave a plenary lecture at the 15th ISFC (Vancouver, 1997). The Book of Abstracts of 13th ISFC has been published as a special issue of the Journal of Fluorine Chemistry. The Book of Abstract of 21st ISFC can be tracked by its ISBN.

== List of Symposia ==
N.	Year	City	Country	Period	Chair(s)	Notes
1	1959	Birmingham	United Kingdom	14–17 July	Colin J. Tatlow	
2	1962	Estes Park	(United States) USA	17–20 July	Ogden R. Pierce, Alan M. Lovelace	
3	1965	Munich	West Germany	30 August - 2 September	Friedrich Weygand	
4	1967	Estes Park	(United States) USA	24–28 July	Paul Tarrant	
5	1969	Moscow	(Soviet Union) USSR	21-26 July	Ivan L. Knunyants	
6	1971	Durham	United Kingdom	18–23 July	William K. R. Musgrave	
7	1973	Santa Cruz	(United States) USA	15–20 July	Neil Bartlett	
8	1976	Kyoto	Japan	22–27 August	Nobuatu Watanabe, Nobuo Ishikawa	
9	1979	Avignon	France	3–7 September	Paul Hagenmuller, Pierre Plurien	
10	1982	Vancouver	Canada	1–6 August	Felix Aubke, Jean'ne Shreeve, Robert C. Thompson, William R. Cullen	
11	1985	Berlin East	East Germany	5–9 August	Lothar Kolditz, Hasso Meinert	
12	1988	Santa Cruz	(United States) USA	7–12 August	Donald J. Burton, Darryl D. Des Marteau, Paul R. Resnick, Stanley M. Williamson	
13	1991	Bochum	Germany	2–6 September	Alois Haas, Peter Sartori	
14	1994	Yokohama	Japan	31 July - 5 August	Nobuatsu Watanabe, Yoshiro Kobayashi, Hiroshi Kobayashi	
15	1997	Vancouver	Canada	2–7 August	Felix Aubke, Jean’ne M. Shreeve	
16	2000	Durham	United Kingdom	16–21 July	Richard D. Chambers, Graham Sandford	
17	2005	Shanghai	China	24–29 July	Wei-Yuan Huang, Xi-Kui Jiang, Qing-Yun Chen	Initially scheduled on July 20–25, 2003
18	2006	Bremen	Germany	30 July - 4 August	Rüdiger Mews, Gerd-Volker Röschenthaler	
19	2009	Jackson Hole	(United States) USA	23–28 August	Joseph S. Thrasher, Olga V. Boltalina, Steven H. Strauss, Richard E. Fernandez	405 participants; joint event with the 3rd International Symposium on Fluorous Technologies
20	2012	Kyoto	Japan	22–27 July	Rika Hagiwara, Takashi Yamazaki	484 participants
21	2015	Como	Italy	23–28 August	Pierangelo Metrangolo, Giuseppe Resnati, Giancarlo Terraneo	559 participants; joint event with the 6th International Symposium on Fluorous Technologies
22	2018	Oxford	United Kingdom	22-27 July	Veronique Gouverneur, David O'Hagan, Graham Sandford	
23	2023	Québec	Canada	23-28 July	Chadron M. Friesen, Michael Gerken, Jean-François Paquin, Gary J. Schrobilgen	306 participants; originally scheduled for summer 2021, joint event with the 9th International Symposium on Fluorous Technologies
24	2024	Shanghai	China	28 July - 2 August	Jinbo Hu (Chair), Xingang Zhang (Co-Chair), Qilong Shen (Co-Chair)	605 participants
