= Compendium of Analytical Nomenclature =

Book describing the nomenclature in analytic chemistry

- The front cover of the third edition of the Orange Book.
- Author: International Union of Pure and Applied Chemistry
- Language: English
- Subject: Chemistry
- Genre: Non-fiction
- Publisher: Pergamon
- Publication date: 1978
- Publication place: United Kingdom
- Media type: Print
- Pages: 223 pp.
- ISBN: 978-0080220086

The Compendium of Analytical Nomenclature is an IUPAC nomenclature book published by the International Union of Pure and Applied Chemistry (IUPAC) containing internationally accepted definitions for terms in analytical chemistry. It has traditionally been published in an orange cover, hence its informal name, the Orange Book.

== Editions ==
There have been four editions of Orange book published; the first in 1978 (ISBN 0-08022-008-8), the second in 1987 (ISBN 0-63201-907-7), the third in 1998 (ISBN 0-86542-615-5), and the fourth in 2023 (ISBN 978-1-78262-947-4).

The third edition is available online.

A Catalan translation has also been published (1987, ISBN 84-7283-121-3).
