= Pure and Applied Chemistry =

- Discipline: Chemistry
- Language: English

Publication details
- History: 1960 to present
- Publisher: Walter de Gruyter for IUPAC (Germany)
- Frequency: Monthly
- Impact factor: 2 (2023)

Standard abbreviations
- ISO 4: Pure Appl. Chem.

Indexing
- ISSN: 1365-3075

Links
- Journal homepage; de Gruyter page

Pure and Applied Chemistry is the official journal for the International Union of Pure and Applied Chemistry (IUPAC). It is published monthly by Walter de Gruyter and contains recommendations and reports, and lectures from symposia. Recommendations can be quite influential like the 1985 Reporting physisorption data for gas/solid systems with special reference to the determination of surface area and porosity which was cited thousands of times.
