= Sigma hole interactions =

Intermolecular forces between oppositely-charged sites on molecules

In chemistry, sigma hole interactions (or σ-hole interactions) are a family of intermolecular forces that can occur between several classes of molecules and arise from an energetically stabilizing interaction between a positively-charged site, termed a sigma hole, and a negatively-charged site, typically a lone pair, on different atoms that are not covalently bonded to each other. These interactions are usually rationalized primarily via dispersion, electrostatics, and electron delocalization (similar to Lewis-acid/base coordination) and are characterized by a strong directional preference that allows control over supramolecular chemistry.

== Molecular basis of interaction ==
The basis of a sigma hole interaction is an energetically stabilizing interaction between a positively charged site (sigma hole) and a negatively charged site (lone pair) on different atoms. The positive site is produced by a covalent sigma bond between the atom hosting the sigma hole and a neighboring atom. The presence of the bond results in the distortion of the electron density around the host atom, with the density increasing equatorially (with respect to the bond) about the atom but decreasing along the extension of the bond. Through this mechanism, a region of positive electrostatic potential, termed a sigma hole, can be localized onto the surface of an atom bearing a sigma bond. This sigma hole could then engage in electrostatic interactions with a lone pair associated with a negative electrostatic potential.

In addition to the electrostatic interaction described above, dispersive forces are also thought to play a role in the overall interaction. Studies have found electrostatic and dispersive contributions to be roughly comparable in magnitude, and for the dominant contributor to vary from system to system.

Alternatively, sigma hole pair interactions can be conceptualized in terms of the mixing of molecular orbitals. The occupied sigma bonding orbital associated with the bond would give rise to a corresponding unoccupied sigma antibonding orbital lying on the opposite face of the atom. Mixing between the antibonding orbital and the occupied orbital associated with a lone pair would be expected to result in energetic stabilization.

Several atoms, including those which are relatively electronegative (such as Chlorine, Oxygen, and even Fluorine) can act as positive sites in sigma hole pair interactions. Counterintuitively, this can occur even when the atom acting as the positive site has an overall negative partial charge. The solution to this apparent contradiction lies in the anisotropy in the electron cloud introduced by the presence of the sigma bond. If the electronic charge is not evenly distributed around the nucleus, it remains possible for a positive partial charge to develop opposite the sigma bond in the region of electron depletion. This partial positive charge coexists with a partial negative charge of larger magnitude associated with the more electron-rich regions of the atomic surface, which results in an overall negative partial charge.

== Characteristics ==
=== Directionality ===
Sigma hole interactions exhibit a strong preference for linearity. Theoretical studies have shown that the interaction is most stabilizing when the negative site is colinear with the bond that gives rise to the sigma hole. As the angle between this bond and the sigma hole interaction is decreased, the strength of the interaction is generally found to decrease rapidly. This finding is consistent with the hypothesis that the sigma hole arises from electronic anisotropy. There are cases in which the angle of interaction does differ somewhat from 180° - in these cases, the influence of additional intermolecular interactions are implicated in determining the overall geometry.

=== Strength ===
Consistent with Coulomb's law, there is a very strong relationship between the energetic stabilization associated with a sigma hole interaction and the product of the electrostatic potentials associated with the sigma hole and lone pair sites. Therefore, factors that increase the electrostatic potential of the sigma hole and decrease the electrostatic potential of the lone pair result in stronger interactions. The main structural factors contributing to the electrostatic potential of the sigma hole are the electronegativity of the host atom, the polarizability of the host atom, and the electron donating or withdrawing character of the group bonded to the host atom, with less electronegative and more polarizable host atoms bound to more electron withdrawing groups associated with the highest electrostatic potential.

The table below shows the computed strength (in kcal/mol) of three selected sigma hole interactions at a variety of angles. At any angle, it can be observed that the interaction is stronger when the Bromine atom hosting the sigma hole is bound to a strongly electron withdrawing cyano group than when this atom is bound to a trifluoromethyl group, which is only moderately electron withdrawing. On the other hand, the interaction is stronger when an ammonia molecule provides the lone pair, as the electrostatic potential associated with this site is more negative than the corresponding site on hydrogen cyanide. In all cases, the interaction is becomes stronger at more linear angles.

Bond angle	NCBr---NH_{3} (kcal/mol)	NCBr---NCH (kcal/mol)	F_{3}CBr---NCH (kcal/mol)
110°	-1.7	-1.0	-0.1
120°	-2.1	-1.2	-0.2
130°	-2.7	-1.5	-0.3
140°	-3.5	-1.7	-0.5
150°	-4.7	-2.2	-0.8
160°	-5.9	-2.7	-1.1
170°	-6.9	-3.2	-1.3
180°	-7.2	-3.3	-1.4

=== Stability ===
While the formation of a sigma hole pair interaction is associated with energetic stabilization, this process is often thermodynamically disfavored as the energetic stabilization is often offset by a decrease in the entropy of the system. It has been shown that an enthalpy-entropy compensation relationship exists between the energetic and entropic changes associated with interactions, with more stabilizing interactions tending to result in larger entropy decreases. However, the decrease in entropy associated with the formation of a sigma hole interaction has been shown to approach a limiting value as the energetic favorability of the process is increased, and as such very energetically stabilizing interactions tend to be thermodynamically favored. There are additional factors that contribute to thermodynamic stability in the liquid and solid phases, which cannot be as easily modeled as gas phase interactions. As such, the favorability of a given sigma hole interaction in the liquid or solid phase may not necessarily match that of the gas phase equivalent.

=== Geometry and vibrational spectra ===
Atoms interacting via a sigma hole interactions are often closer than the sum of their van der waals radii. In addition, sigma hole interactions are also often associated with changes in the lengths and vibrational stretching frequencies of the covalent bond that gives rise to the sigma hole. Depending on the system engaging in the interaction, either a "blue shift", in which the bond contracts and the vibrational stretching frequency increases, or a "red shift", in which the bond lengthens and the vibrational stretching frequency decreases, is possible. The extent of these effects are related to the strength of the interaction, with stronger interactions tending to produce shorter interatomic distances between the interacting atoms and stronger red shifts.

== Scope ==
The sigma hole formalism has been applied to a wide range of interactions involving electrostatic and dispersive attraction between positively and negatively charged sites. These interactions are typically classified according to the identity of the atom that hosts the positively charged site. Interaction types that are broadly accepted as subclasses of the sigma hole interaction include tetrel bonding (in which a sigma hole resides on an atom of group IV), pnictogen bonding (group V), chalcogen bonding (group VI), and halogen bonding (group VII).

It remains a matter of some debate whether hydrogen bonding is best classified as a sigma hole interaction, in which the sigma hole lies on the Hydrogen atom, or as a distinct class of interactions. While hydrogen bonds and sigma hole interactions of groups IV-VII both exhibit directional preferences towards linearity, the ability of hydrogen bonds to deviate from an ideal 180° angle is much greater. On the other hand, it has been argued that the underlying mechanism dictating both interactions is identical, and the observed difference in orientational preference can be attributed to a difference in the shape of the sigma holes.

== Applications ==
Sigma hole interactions have applications in a variety of fields. The ability to induce stabilizing and strongly directional intermolecular interactions which can be easily tuned via minor structural substitutions makes leveraging these interactions particularly value in fields in which control over supramolecular organization is desired. As such, sigma hole interactions have been used in the field of crystal engineering to design molecular building blocks for self-assembly, to improve the properties of liquid crystals, and to design magnetic materials.
