= Dennis P. Curran =

American organic chemist and professor of chemistry

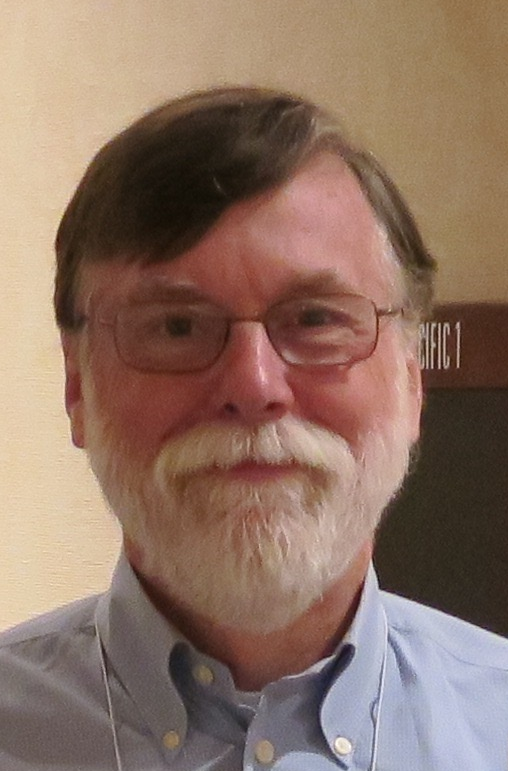
- Dennis P. Curran
- Born: June 10, 1953 (age 73); Easton, Pennsylvania
- Known for: Organic synthesis Radical chemistry Fluorous chemistry
- Awards: Chaire Blaise Pascal Award (2006); Fellow of the American Chemical Society (inaugural class, 2009); Ernest Guenther Award (2015)
- Scientific career
- Fields: Chemistry
- Workplaces: University of Pittsburgh

Dennis P. Curran (born June 10, 1953) is an American organic chemist and a professor of chemistry at University of Pittsburgh known for his research in the fields of organic chemistry, radical chemistry, and fluorous chemistry.

== Career and personal life ==
Curran received his BS degree from Boston College in 1975 and his PhD degree from the University of Rochester in 1979 working under the direction of Andrew S. Kende. After postdoctoral studies with Barry Trost at the University of Wisconsin, he joined the University of Pittsburgh Department of Chemistry as an assistant professor in 1981. He became associate professor in 1986, full professor in 1988, and distinguished service professor in 1995. He became the first Bayer Professor of Chemistry in 1996 and since 2019 is the Covestro Professor of Chemistry.

Chemistry runs in Curran's family. His father, Dr. William V. Curran (1929–2019), was a 60-year member of the American Chemical Society and the inventor of the third-generation cephalosporin antibiotic cefuzonam. His younger brother Kevin J. Curran has won the Technical Achievement Award of the American Chemical Society Division of Organic Chemistry (2007).

== Research areas ==
=== Radical chemistry ===
Curran is known for his pioneering work on organic radicals and radical cyclizations, especially directed towards organic synthesis. Prior to the 1980s, radicals were neglected because they were thought to be too reactive and too unselective for use in organic synthesis. Curran parlayed cascade reactions of radicals (also called tandem reactions or domino reactions) into powerful tools to make natural products. His 1985 total synthesis of hirsutene, the first of many such syntheses with cascade radical reactions, is today regarded as a classic.

Curran also revitalized atom transfer radical reactions. These reactions are also called Kharasch addition reactions (or sometimes Curran-Kharasch reactions). Morris S. Kharasch discovered and pioneered halogen atom transfer addition reactions in an initial flowering period in the late 1940s and 1950s. About 40 years later, Curran described fast new reactions involving iodine transfer, bromine transfer and functional group transfer, and encompassing radical addition (ATRA), cyclization (ATRC) and annulation. He introduced sunlamps as convenient tools for photo-initiation of ATRA and ATRC reactions. Curran is also a pioneer in stereoselective radical reactions and radical translocation reactions.

Radical reactions are today regarded as powerful tools for synthesis of natural products and other organic molecules. Curran's work helped to expose many of the features that are now considered hallmarks of organic radical reactions. Synthetic economy is a primary attraction. Protecting groups and activating functional groups are often superfluous (atom economy). In addition, several bonds can be formed simultaneously (step/pot economy). Other features include reliability, predictability, selectivity, functional group tolerance and inertness to water and other protic solvents. A 1991 synthesis of the important anti-cancer agent camptothecin illustrates many of these features. The synthesis takes place over six steps centered on a cascade radical reaction that makes three bonds and two rings. There are no protecting groups, no functional group transformations, no reductions and only one oxidation.

=== Fluorous Chemistry ===
Curran has also pioneered many aspects of the relatively young field of fluorous chemistry. Expanding on the initial 1995 concept of fluorous biphasic catalysis, he introduced the concepts of fluorous tagging and fluorous synthesis in 1997 under the new guise of strategy level separations. Curran introduced light fluorous reactions, fluorous triphasic reactions, fluorous phase vanishing reactions (with Ilhyong Ryu) and fluorous mixture synthesis (or FMS). FMS is the first example of solution phase synthesis with separation tagging, and it has been used to make many analogs and stereoisomers of complex natural products. The techniques of FMS allow 4–16 analogs or isomers to be made in a single synthesis. Curran also introduced fluorous solid phase extraction, a simple separation technique that enabled much subsequent work. The high resolution version of the technique, fluorous chromatography, is the basis of FMS.

== Service ==
Curran has held various positions in the American Chemical Society (ACS) Division of Organic Chemistry hierarchy, culminating as chair of the Division in 2000. He was an Associate Editor of Organic Reactions from 1991–2001 and Editor of Tetrahedron Letters from 1995–2001. He is a member of Organic Syntheses, Inc and edited Volume 83 in 2006. He was a member of the Executive Committee of the symposium "Gomberg•2000, A Century of Radical Chemistry", and he spearheaded the presentation on June 25, 2000, of an ACS National Chemical Landmark to the University of Michigan for Gomberg's 1900 discovery of organic free radicals.

== Awards and honors ==
Curran is an ACS Fellow and has received several local ACS Section Awards. His national ACS Awards are: the Cope Scholar Award, under-35 category (now called early-career category) (1988), the Award for Creativity in Organic Synthesis (2000), the Award for Creative Work in Fluorine Chemistry (2008), and the Ernst Guenther Award in the Chemistry of Natural Products (2014). He won the Dr. Paul Janssen Prize for Creativity in Organic Synthesis in 1998. Curran has a long history of interaction with the French organic chemistry community. His awards from France include a Chaire Blaise Pascal (2006) from the Région Île-de-France, and a Doctorat Honoris Causa (honorary doctoral degree) from the Université Pierre et Marie Curie, Paris (2010).
