= Pnictogen bond =

Net attractive interaction involving one of the pnictogen elements

In chemistry, a pnictogen bond (PnB) is a non-covalent interaction, occurring where there is a net attractive force between an electrophilic region on a 'donor' pnictogen atom (Pn) in a molecule, and a nucleophilic region on an 'acceptor' atom, which may be in the same or another molecule. Closely related to halogen and chalcogen bonding, pnictogen bonds are a form of non-covalent interaction which can be considered in terms of charge-transfer and electrostatic interactions.

== Physical origins ==
Pnictogen bonds typically demonstrate directionality, with the interaction forming either on a linear projection to the R–Pn bond (a σ-hole) or in a plane perpendicular to the three coplanar R–Pn bonds (a π-hole). In such cases, polarisation of the pnictogen atom by an electron-withdrawing substituent, results in an anisotropic electron distribution in the Pn atom affording a directional electropositive region, resulting in an attractive electrostatic interaction. As the polarisability of an atom increases upon descending the periodic table, pnictogen bond strengths typically increase upon descending pnictogen group, both as a result of increased poliarisation resulting in a greater electrostatic contribution to bonding, but also through increased dispersion interactions between the heavier PnB donor and the PnB acceptor atom.

Contributions to pnictogen bonding interactions can also arise through charge transfer interactions, in which a lone pair on the pnictogen bond acceptor are donated into a σ*-orbital on the pnictogen atom. Despite the charge transfer interaction, pnictogen bond interactions are non-covalent interactions, with X···Y bond lengths shorter than the sum of the van der Waals radii, but significantly longer than the sum of the covalent radii.

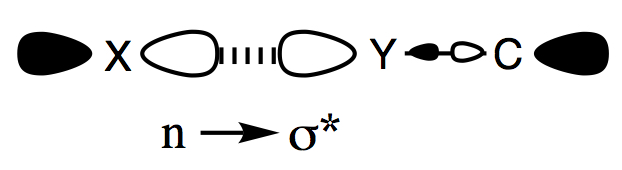
Orbital mixing schematic for an n → σ* interaction which result in a charge transfer contribution to pnictogen bonds.

== Applications ==
The directionality of σ-hole interactions, including PnB interactions, has resulted in their exploitation within the field of supramolecular chemistry, incorporating PnB donor systems into a range of systems exploiting the formation of weak intermolecular interactions for a range of applications.

=== Organocatalysis ===
PnB donors have been demonstrated to be capable of functioning as Lewis acidic catalysts. PnB catalysis was first reported in 2018 when PnB interactions were demonstrated to be potent catalysts for the Reissert reaction. Given their intermediate position in the main group of the periodic table, PnB catalysis may be appealing due to a balance between steric repulsion and polarisability factors.

=== Anion recognition ===
As for halogen and chalocogen bonding interactions, the σ-hole interactions in PnB hosts have been exploited for anion binding and recognition, with a report in 2022 exploiting a series of triaryl antinomy and bismuth receptors for binding of halide anions. The reported systems demonstrated selectivity for chloride from other halies and over the binding of oxoanions, in contrast to trends observed for hydrogen bonding systems, suggesting PnB interactions may have advantages in selective halide anion sensing over hydrogen bonding systems.

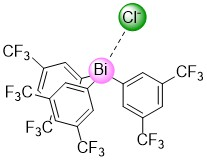
A pnictogen bonding anion receptor from Beer and co-workers.

=== Transmembrane transport ===
PnB systems have also been shown to be capable of transmembrane anion transport, in which lipophilic organopnictogen compounds bind an anion through PnB interactions, enabling transport. The redox activity of main group systems enables the tuning of transport, in which 'on/off' switchable behaviour is enabled between an inactive carrier and a reduced carrier. Park and Gabbaï have demonstrated such a system, in which reduction of an adjacent sulfonium enables the transmembrane transport of anions by an antimony transporter.

== See also ==
- Sigma hole interactions
- Non-covalent interactions
