= Javier García Martinez =

Spanish chemist

- Born: 1973 (age 52–53); Logroño (Spain)

Javier García Martínez (born 1973) is a Spanish inorganic chemist, who served as the president of the International Union of Pure and Applied Chemistry (IUPAC) in 2022–23. He was born in Logroño, and researches in the area of nanotechnology for the technological development and commercialization of catalysts that reduce carbon dioxide emissions.

== Career ==
García Martínez is a professor of inorganic chemistry at the University of Alicante, and directs the molecular nanotechnology laboratory where he researches and works on the manufacture of nanomaterials for energy applications, water treatment, production and adequate use of biomass and gas separation techniques.

While at the Massachusetts Institute of Technology (MIT) in 2004 he founded Rive Technology to exploit his catalyst research. The company was acquired by the North American multinational WR Grace in 2019.

He has published on nanomaterials and on energy-related topics. His latest published books are Nanotechnology for the Energy Challenge (Wiley, 2010), The Chemical Element (Wiley, 2011), Chemistry Education (Wiley 2014), Mesoporous Zeolites (Wiley 2015), Chemistry Entrepreunership (Wiley 2021) and Spain for sure (Planeta, 2021).

== Awards, honors and societies ==
He was the president of the International Union of Pure and Applied Chemistry in 2022–23. He currently leads the Chair of Science and Society of the Rafael del Pino Foundation, where he directs a report on technology and competitiveness of the Spanish economy. He also chairs the Young Academy of Spain is a member of the Board of Trustees and the Advisory Council of the Gadea Foundation for Science.

He was recognized by the World Economic Forum as a Young Global Leader and by the Massachusetts Institute of Technology with the Innovators Under 35 award, and in 2014, he was awarded the Rey Jaime I Award in the category of New Technologies. In 2015 he received the Emerging Researcher Award from the American Chemical Society. In 2017, he was recognized by the American Chemical Society as the best entrepreneur in the US in the chemical sector and in 2018 he received the Kathryn C. Hach Award. He is a member of the Council on Emerging Technologies of the World Economic Forum, of the Global Young Academy and Fellow of the Royal Society of Chemistry and the American Chemical Society.
