= Fluorous chemistry =

Fluorous chemistry involves the use of perfluorinated compounds or perfluorinated substituents to facilitate recovery of a catalyst or reaction product. Perfluorinated groups impart unique physical properties including high solubility in perfluorinated solvents. This property can be useful in organic synthesis and separation methods such as solid phase extraction. In practice, a perfluorinated alkyl group is incorporated into an otherwise conventional organic reagent as an affinity tag. These reagents can then be separated from organic solvents by extraction with fluorinated solvents such as perfluorohexane.

== Applications ==
The utility of fluorous chemistry hinges on the partitioning modality distinct from polar/non-polar or hydrophilic/hydrophobic. A major application of fluorous chemistry involves the use of fluorosurfactant perfluorooctanoic acid (PFOA) to facilitate the production of Teflon. The technology is controversial because of the slow rates of biodegradation of such compounds.

=== Ponytails ===
In compounds exploited in academic fluorous chemistry, molecules comprise both nonfluorous and fluorous domains. The fluorous domain is often a substituent intended to confer solubility in the fluorocarbon medium. Such perfluorosubstituents are often introduced in what are called ponytails. Typical fluorous ponytails have the formula CF_{3}(CF_{2})_{n}(CH_{2})_{m}- where n is about 10 and m is about 3.

Through the use of high affinity of fluorous tags (ponytails) for fluorous phases or fluorous-derivatized solid phases allows for near complete recovery of the tagged reagent (i.e., near complete reduction in a chemical waste stream), making the use of fluorous chemistry techniques a popular topic in green chemistry.

== Partition coefficients ==
The fluorous character of a molecule can be assessed by its partition coefficient between a perfluorocarbon and a hydrocarbon. In the following table, the data are for perfluoromethylcyclohexane:toluene.

solute	partition coefficient for CF_{3}C_{6}F_{11}:toluene
octane	5.4:94.6
CH_{3}(CH_{2})_{13}CH=CH_{2}	0.9:99.1
C_{6}H_{6}	6:94
C_{6}F_{6}	28.0:72.0
C_{10}F_{22}(CH_{2})_{3}OH	80.5:19.5
C_{8}F_{20}(CH_{2})_{3}C_{6}H_{5}	49.5:50.5
C_{8}F_{20}C_{6}H_{5}	77.5:22.5

== Scientific community ==
The International Symposium on Fluorous Technologies (ISoFT) is a biennial meeting that brings together scientists working in the area of fluorous chemistry.

== Representative journal articles ==
- Yu, M. S.; Curran, D. P.; Nagashima, T. (2005). "Increasing Fluorous Partition Coefficients by Solvent Tuning". Org. Lett. 7 (17): 3677–3680. doi:10.1021/ol051170p. PMID 16092848.
- Zhang, W.; Curran, D. P. (2006). "Synthetic Applications of Fluorous Solid-Phase Extraction (F-SPE)". Tetrahedron. 62 (51): 11837–11865. doi:10.1016/j.tet.2006.08.051. PMC 2396515. PMID 18509513.
