= Mary Garson =

British-Australian chemist and academic

Mary Garson AM FAA
- Born: Mary Jean Garson; 6 November 1953 (age 72); Rugby, England
- Education: University of Cambridge
- Known for: Researching the structure, biosynthesis and function of natural products.
- Scientific career
- Fields: Chemistry and Chemical Ecology of secondary metabolites from sponges and molluscs.
- Workplaces: Murray Edwards College (New Hall) Cambridge; James Cook University of North Queensland; University of Wollongong; University of Queensland

Mary Jean Garson AM FAA (born 6 November 1953) is a British-Australian organic chemist and academic. She is an Emerita Professor in the School of Chemistry and Molecular Biosciences at the University of Queensland.

== Early life ==
Garson was born in Rugby, England, the daughter of an engineer and botanist. She took her B.A with Honours from the University of Cambridge, Newnham College in 1974. Garson's focus was the natural sciences, specializing in chemistry. She obtained an MA in Natural Sciences and she took her PhD in organic chemistry from Cambridge in 1977.

== Career ==
Garson won a Royal Society postdoctoral fellowship after her PhD, undertaking research in Rome, Italy from 1977 to 1978. She continued her research at New Hall at Cambridge on a college research fellowship from 1978 to 1981. She worked as a medicinal chemist from 1981 to 1983 at Smith Kline and French Research Ltd in Welwyn, England,.

Garson won a Queen Elizabeth II Research Fellowship from James Cook University (1983–1986), based in the Townsville region to research the bioactive organic chemicals in marine organisms. In Townsville, she undertook dive training to study on the Great Barrier Reef. Garson then took a teaching/research position as the first female academic in chemistry at the University of Wollongong, before moving to the University of Queensland as a lecturer in 1990. She was promoted to Senior Lecturer in 1992 and Reader in 1998. She researches and publishes on the structure, biosynthesis and function of natural products, especially those from marine invertebrates and other microorganisms. She also researches the chemistry of South East Asian medicinal plants.

Garson was promoted to Professor in the School of Chemistry and Molecular Biosciences in 2006, and has served as Deputy Head of the School from 2005 to 2009. Since 2021, she is an Emeritus Professor of Chemistry at the university.

== Awards and honours ==
- 2009 – Our Women, Our State (Queensland Government) – Highly Commended
- 2011 – Leighton Medal of the Royal Australian Chemical Institute, in recognition of her contributions and leadership to the chemistry community, within Australia and overseas.
- 2013 – Distinguished Woman in Chemistry or Chemical Engineering award of the International Union of Pure and Applied Chemistry
- 2014 – named as one of "175 Faces of Chemistry" by the Royal Society of Chemistry, UK
- 2017 – inaugural Margaret Sheil Women in Chemistry Leadership award of the Royal Australian Chemical Institute
- 2018 - Royal Society of Chemistry, Australasian lecturer (by invitation)
- 2019 – Member of the Order of Australia (AM) in the Australia Day Honours for "significant service to education, particularly to organic chemistry, and as an advocate for women in science".
- 2023 – named as a Distinguished Fellow of the Royal Australian Chemical Institute
- 2024 – elected Fellow of the Australian Academy of Science

A species of marine flatworm, discovered at Heron Island, is named for her Maritigrella marygarsonae.

== Memberships ==
- President-Royal Australian Chemical Institute (Queensland Division)
- Chair, International Relations Committee of RACI
- Member, National Committee for Chemistry
- Executive Secretary, World Chemistry Congress/IUPAC General Assembly (2001)
- Chair, Board of Australian Science Innovations
- Organiser, Chemistry-Biotechnology Symposium at World Chemistry Congress (Torino, 2007); 27th International Symposium on the Chemistry of Natural Products (Brisbane, 2011)
- Organiser, Women sharing a Chemical Moment in Time, International Year of Chemistry (2011)
- Leadership roles in Division III (organic and biomolecular) of International Union of Pure and Applied Chemistry (IUPAC) as Titular Member (2006-2007), Secretary (2008-2011), President-elect (2012–2013), Division President and Bureau Member (2014–2015), then as Past-President (2016-2017)
- Elected to Membership of the Bureau of the International Union of Pure and Applied Chemistry (2018-2021)
- Co-chair IUPAC100 (centennial) Management Committee (2016-2019)
- Co-convenor of Women's Global Breakfast networking event held in over 100 countries since 2019; the theme for the 2024 breakfast event on February 27 is "Catalyzing Change in Chemistry"
- Incoming Vice-President/President-elect, and Chair of the Science Board, of the International Union of Pure and Applied Chemistry for 2024-2025
