= Nicola Pohl =

American chemist

Nicola Lucia B. Pohl
- Education: University of Wisconsin–Madison (PhD); Radcliffe College (MA)
- Scientific career
- Workplaces: Iowa State University; Indiana University Bloomington; Stanford University
- Thesis: Synthesis of carbohydrate-based ligands for the selectins and galectins (1997)
- Doctoral advisor: Laura L. Kiessling

Nicola Lucia B. Pohl is an American chemist who is the Joan & Marvin Carmack Chair at Indiana University Bloomington. She also serves as Associate Dean of Natural and Mathematical Sciences. Her research considers new approaches to make and analyse sugars. In 2020 she was elected a Fellow of the American Association for the Advancement of Science.

== Early life and education ==
Pohl earned her master's degree in at Radcliffe College. She graduated in 1991 having majored in English and American literature. Her graduate dissertation considered the works of Flannery O'Connor and Walker Percy. After completing her master's, Pohl started a doctoral research programme in chemistry at the University of Wisconsin–Madison. She has said that she was inspired by her Harvard chemistry professor, Dudley R. Herschbach. Her doctoral research involved the synthesis of carbohydrate-based ligands under the supervision of Laura L. Kiessling. She joined Stanford University as a National Institutes of Health postdoctoral fellow in the research group of Chaitan Khosla.

== Research and career ==
In 2000 Pohl joined the faculty at Iowa State University. She spent twelve years in Iowa, eventually being made Wilkinson Professor of Chemistry and Biomedical Engineering. In 2008 she founded LuCELLa Biosciences, a spin-out company who specialise in the custom synthesis of carbohydrates. Pohl joined Indiana University Bloomington in 2012, where she was made the Professor and Joan & Marvin Carmack Chair.

Pohl is interested in the synthesis and characterisation of sugars in an effort to better understand their role in biological function. By better understanding the interactions of carbohydrates, Pohl believes that she will be able to rationally design vaccinations and other therapies. She demonstrated an oligosaccharide synthesis process that involved automated solution-phase methods. The automation process involves the use of fluorocarbon tags that can be used to pattern the surfaces of tagged molecules to form carbohydrate microarrays. Pohl spent 2019 as a Fulbright Program scholar at the University of Natural Resources and Life Sciences, Vienna.

== Awards and honours ==
- 2004 National Science Foundation CAREER Award
- 2010 American Chemical Society Horace S. Isbell Award
- 2017 Elected Edward, Frances, and Shirley B. Daniels Fellow at Harvard University
- 2017 International Fluorous Technology Award
- 2017 Silicon Valley Chemist Harry and Carol Mosher Award
- 2018 American Chemical Society Melville L. Wolfram Award
- 2019 Fulbright Program Scholar
- 2020 Elected a Fellow of the American Association for the Advancement of Science

== Selected publications ==
- Kiessling, Laura L.; Pohl, Nicola L. (1996-02-01). "Strength in numbers: non-natural polyvalent carbohydrate derivatives". Chemistry & Biology. 3 (2): 71–77. doi:10.1016/S1074-5521(96)90280-X. ISSN 1074-5521. PMID 8807830.
- Ko, Kwang-Seuk; Jaipuri, Firoz A.; Pohl, Nicola L. (2005-09-28). "Fluorous-Based Carbohydrate Microarrays". Journal of the American Chemical Society. 127 (38): 13162–13163. Bibcode:2005JAChS.12713162K. doi:10.1021/ja054811k. ISSN 0002-7863. PMID 16173741.
- Wacker, Michael; Feldman, Mario F.; Callewaert, Nico; Kowarik, Michael; Clarke, Bradley R.; Pohl, Nicola L.; Hernandez, Marcela; Vines, Enrique D.; Valvano, Miguel A.; Whitfield, Chris; Aebi, Markus (2006-05-02). "Substrate specificity of bacterial oligosaccharyltransferase suggests a common transfer mechanism for the bacterial and eukaryotic systems". Proceedings of the National Academy of Sciences. 103 (18): 7088–7093. Bibcode:2006PNAS..103.7088W. doi:10.1073/pnas.0509207103. ISSN 0027-8424. PMC 1459022. PMID 16641107.
