= Georges Smets =

Belgian lawyer, historian, sociologist and ethnologist

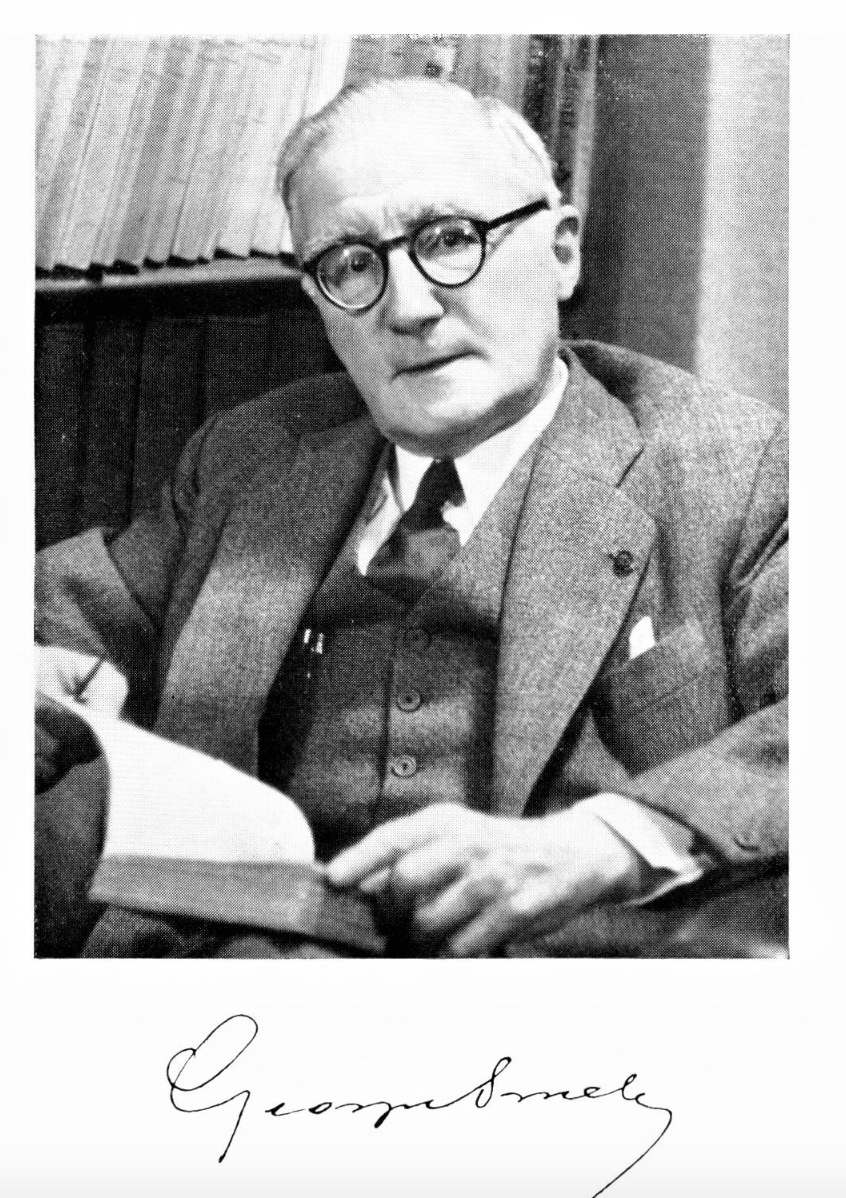
- Born: Georges Smets; 7 July 1881; Molenbeek-Saint-Jean, Brussels
- Died: 8 February 1961 (aged 79); Etterbeek, Brussels
- Education: Ph.D., Free University of Brussels
- Occupations: Lawyer, Historian, Sociologist

Georges Smets (Molenbeek-Saint-Jean, Brussels, 7 July 1881 – Etterbeek, 8 February 1961) was a Belgian lawyer, historian, sociologist and ethnologist. Initially trained as a historian and lawyer, He was Professor and Rector of the Free University of Brussels (1929–1932) and Director of the Solvay Institute of Sociology (1934–?).

== Education ==
For his secondary education, Georges Smets studied Greek and Latin at the Athenee Royal in Brussels. After receiving multiple prizes for his academic prowess, Smets entered the Free University of Brussels. He graduated with a doctorate in Philosophy and Letters in 1903, earning the highest distinction.

In 1904 Smets earned the title of special doctor in history with another distinction following the completion of his thesis on Henry I, Duke of Brabant.

Rounding off his formative education, and earning yet another distinction, Smets graduated with a doctorate in Law in 1908.

== Academic career ==
Smets became acting professor in 1906 whilst studying law, teaching two History courses in Brussels: 'Notions on the political institutions of Rome' and 'Political history of Rome'. Smets took up the more full-time position of lecturer in 1908, finally obtaining the title of full professor in 1918 when he left the Brussels bar to devote himself wholly to teaching.

In 1929, Smets became the rector of the Free University of Brussels, a position he would hold until 1932. The same year, he became deputy director of the Solvay Institute of Sociology, ascending to the role of director two years later. In 1935, he embarked on an anthropological trip to Burundi, Rwanda and the Buha region in Kigoma, Tanzania to gather historical, linguistic and administrative information for the Fonds Jacques Cassel at the Université libre de Bruxelles. He also collected information on the genealogies of various tribal chiefs and dynasties in the region. One such study of his traced the first dynasty of Urundi, the Benerwamba. Personal documents of Smets' showed that he relied on the knowledge of local specialists to build a picture of the histories of local dynasties. In 1940, like many of his colleagues, he was dismissed from his post by the German authorities. Moving for a time to Toulouse, he became a member and later foreign correspondent of the Committee of the Académie des Inscriptions et Belles-Lettres. Four years later, he returned to Brussels to resume his duties prior to the war, becoming a permanent member of the Board of Directors at the Université libre de Bruxelles. Smets chaired the committee of the Institute of Philology, Oriental and Slavic History from 1947 to 1954. He became honorary director of the Solvay Institute in 1953. His final appointment was in 1955, when he was made honorary rector of his much-loved Université libre de Bruxelles.

== Archives ==
Smets' files and papers as related to his 1934–35 Africa expedition can be found at the Royal Museum for Central Africa, Tervuren. Further archival material pertaining to this visit can be found at the African Studies Centre.

== Awards and honours ==
- Grand Officer of the Order of the Crown and Order of Leopold II
- Officer of the Legion of Honour
- Commander of the Order of the Redeemer
- Commander of the Order of St. Sava
