= Krishna Kumar (chemist) =

Indian American chemist (born 1970)

- Born: 1 November 1970 (age 55); Madras, Tamil Nadu, India
- Education: St. Stephen's College, Delhi; Delhi University; Brown University; The Scripps Research Institute
- Scientific career
- Fields: Chemical biology, Biophysics, Organic chemistry
- Workplaces: Tufts University
- Thesis: Through Solvent Electron Transfer in Molecular C-Clamps (1996)
- Doctoral advisor: Matthew B. Zimmt
- Other academic advisors: M. Reza Ghadiri

Krishna Kumar (born 1 November 1970) is an Indian American chemist whose research spans organic chemistry, chemical biology, bioorganic chemistry, biophysics and cell biology. He is currently Robinson Professor of Chemistry and was also Chemistry Department Chair from 2006 to 2009; and from 2012 to 2018 at Tufts University.

== Career ==
Prior to Tufts University, he was at the Scripps Research Institute in La Jolla, California and got his bachelor's degree in chemistry with honors from St. Stephen's College, Delhi and a Ph.D. degree in chemistry (1996) from Brown University.

Kumar has given proteins hyperstable folding properties by inserting fluorinated amino acids into them. Recent studies by his research team have shown that fluorination of biologically active antimicrobial peptides is an effective strategy for improving their stability and antimicrobial therapeutic value.

In addition to antibiotics, Kumar's work includes the design of fluorinated drug delivery systems using lipids as carriers, and potential cancer drugs and imaging agents. His laboratory has also invented methods for cell surface engineering and imaging of cancer cells with metastatic potential.

== Awards, honors, affiliations and positions ==
- Elected Fellow of the Royal Society of Chemistry (UK), 2018
- Graduate Teaching and Mentoring Award, Tufts Graduate School of AS&E (2015)
- Elected Fellow of the American Association for the Advancement of Science (AAAS), 2012
- Award for Excellence in the Chemical Sciences, Indian Society of Chemists and Biologists (2011)
- Global Indus Technovator Award, MIT IBC (2006)
- Technology Investigation Award, Massachusetts Technology Transfer Center (2005)
- MIT Technology Review TR100 Award (2003)
- DuPont Young Professor Award, E. I. DuPont de Nemours & Co. (2003–2006)
- NSF CAREER Award, National Science Foundation (2002–2007)
- Guest Professor, Westfälische Wilhelms–Universität, Münster, Germany (2000)
- Teaching with Technology (TTT) Fellow, Academic Technology, Tufts U (1999)
- Professor of Chemistry, Tufts University (2006–present)
- Chairman, Department of Chemistry, Tufts University (2006–2009; 2012–2018)
- Member, Cancer Center, Tufts Medical Center
- Visiting Scientist, Center for Cancer Research, MIT (2004–2005)
- Adjunct Professor, Biomedical Engineering, Tufts University (2002–present)
- Assistant and associate professor of chemistry, Tufts University (1998–2005)
- Vice President, Society of Fellows, The Scripps Research Institute (1996–98)
- Sigma Xi Award for Excellence in Research, Sigma Xi Research Honor Society, 1995
- Chancellor of the Exchequer, St. Stephen's College, Delhi (1990–91)

== Publications ==
Web of Science shows these as the 10 most cited publications:

1. Bilgiçer, B.; Fichera, A.; Kumar, K. "A Coiled Coil with a Fluorous Core."J. Am. Chem. Soc. 2001, 123, 4393–4399. Discussed by : "Fluorous Peptides." by Stu Borman, C&EN 2001, 79(20), 41–42; "Heart Cut" Chemical Innovation 2001, 31 (11), pp. 10.; "Steps Towards Nanotechnology" by Jeffrey Soreff, Institute for Molecular Manufacturing (IMM), IMM Report No. 26, 23 October 2001.
2. Bilgiçer, B.; Xing, X.; Kumar, K. "Programmed Self-Sorting of Coiled Coils with Leucine and Hexafluoroleucine Cores." J. Am. Chem. Soc. 2001, 123, 11815–11816. Discussed by: Science & Technology Roundup, C&EN 2001, 79 (49), p. 35.
3. Yoder, N. C.; Kumar, K. "Fluorinated Amino Acids in Protein Design and Engineering." Chem. Soc. Rev. 2002, 31, 335–341.
4. Bilgicer B, Kumar K "Synthesis and thermodynamic characterization of self-sorting coiled coils " Tetrahedron 2002 58( 20) 4105–4112.
5. Bilgiçer, B.; Kumar, K. "De Novo Design of Defined Helical Bundles in Membrane Environments." Proc. Natl. Acad. Sci. U.S.A. 2004, 101, 15324–15329.
6. Myers, K. E.; Kumar, K. "Fluorophobic Acceleration of Diels-Alder Reactions." J. Am. Chem. Soc. 2000, 122, 12025–12026.
7. Xing, X.; Fichera, A.; Kumar, K. "A Novel Synthesis of Enantiomerically Pure 5,5,5,5',5',5'–Hexafluoroleucine." Org. Lett. 2001, 3, 1285–1286.
8. Meng, H.; Kumar, K. "Antimicrobial Activity and Protease Stability of Peptides Containing Fluorinated Amino Acids" J. Am. Chem. Soc. 2007, 129, 15615–15622. Discussed by: "Fluorous Peptides Get Ready to Heal" by Stephen Ritter, C&EN 2007, 85 (37), pp. 36–37; "Putting the "F" in peptides" by Randall C Willis; Drug Discovery News 2007, December.
9. Montanari V.; Kumar, K. "Just Add Water: A New Fluorous Capping Reagent for Facile Purification of Peptides Synthesized on the Solid Phase." J. Am. Chem. Soc. 2004, 126, 9528–9529.
10. Wang P, Fichera A, Kumar K, et al. "Alternative translations of a single RNA message: An identity switch of (2S,3R)-4,4,4-trifluorovaline between valine and isoleucine codons " (2004)Angewandte Chemie International Ed. 43 (28) 3664–3666.
