= International Conference on Green Chemistry =

International conference

The International IUPAC Conferences on Green Chemistry (ICGCs) gather several hundreds scientists, technologists, and experts from all over the world with the aim to exchange and disseminate new ideas, discoveries, and projects on green chemistry and a sustainable development. After mid twentieth century, an increasingly general consensus acknowledges that these subjects play a unique role in mapping the way ahead for the humankind progress. Typical topics discussed in these IUPAC Conferences are:

- bio-based renewable chemical resources, bio-inspired materials and nanomaterials, bio-based polymers;
- polymer composites and natural surfactants;
- green solvents, catalysts, and synthetic methodologies (e.g., microwaves, ultrasounds, solid state synthesis), biocatalysis and biotransformations;
- biofuels and chemistry for improved energy harvesting;
- materials for sustainable construction and cultural heritage;
- pollution prevention;
- metrics, evaluation, education, and communication of green chemistry.

== History ==
In 2006 the International Union of Pure and Applied Chemistry (IUPAC) promoted the organization of the 1st International IUPAC Conference on Green-Sustainable Chemistry (ICGC-1). This conference, started in collaboration with the German Chemical Society (GDCh), was a major acknowledgement by IUPAC of the relevance of green chemistry. The Special Topic Issue on Green Chemistry in Pure and Applied Chemistry and the starting of a Subcommittee on Green Chemistry, operating in the IUPAC Division of Organic and Biomolecular Chemistry, were two important landmarks towards that acknowledgement. ICGC-1 registered the presence of over 450 participants from 42 countries and proceedings were published in Pure and Applied Chemistry. This Conference then became a biannual appointment that continuously attracted several hundreds scientists and technologists from academia, research institutes, and industries.

On 14 July 2017, IUPAC established the Interdivisional Committee on Green Chemistry for Sustainable Development ICGCSD that supersedes the former Subcommittee on Green Chemistry and has the aim to assist IUPAC in initiating, promoting, and coordinating the work of the Union in the area of green and sustainable chemistry.

ICGCSD will continue to organize the ICGCs Series. The next 8th Conference will take place in Bangkok, Thailand, in September 2018.

== List of Conferences ==
N.	Year	City	Country	Date	Chair(s)	Proceedings published in (Event announced by)
1	2006	Dresden	Germany	10–15 September	Piero Tundo and Wolfgang Hoelderich	Pure Appl. Chem. 2007, 79(11), 1833–2105 (Chem. Int. 2005, 27(6))
2	2008	Moscow	Russia	14–20 September	Valery V. Lunin and Ekaterina Lokteva	Pure Appl. Chem. 2009, 81(11), 1961-2129 (Chem. Int. 2007, 29(6))
3	2010	Ottawa	Canada	15–19 August	Philip Jessop	Pure Appl. Chem. 2011, 83(7), 1343-1406 (Chem. Int. 2009, 31(4))
4http://www.ufscar.br/icgc4/index.html	2012	Foz do Iguaçu	Brazil	25–29 August	Arlene Correa and Vania Zuin	Pure Appl. Chem. 2013, 85(8), 1611–1710 (Chem. Int. 2011, 33(2))
5	2014	Durban	South Africa	17–21 August	Liliana Mammino	Pure Appl. Chem. to be published on 2016
6	2016	Venice	Italy	4–8 September	Piero Tundo	Pure Appl. Chem. to be published on 2018
7	2017	Moscow	Russia	2-5 October	Natalia P. Tarasova	Pure Appl. Chem. to be published on 2019
