= Konrad Seppelt =

German chemist (born 1944)

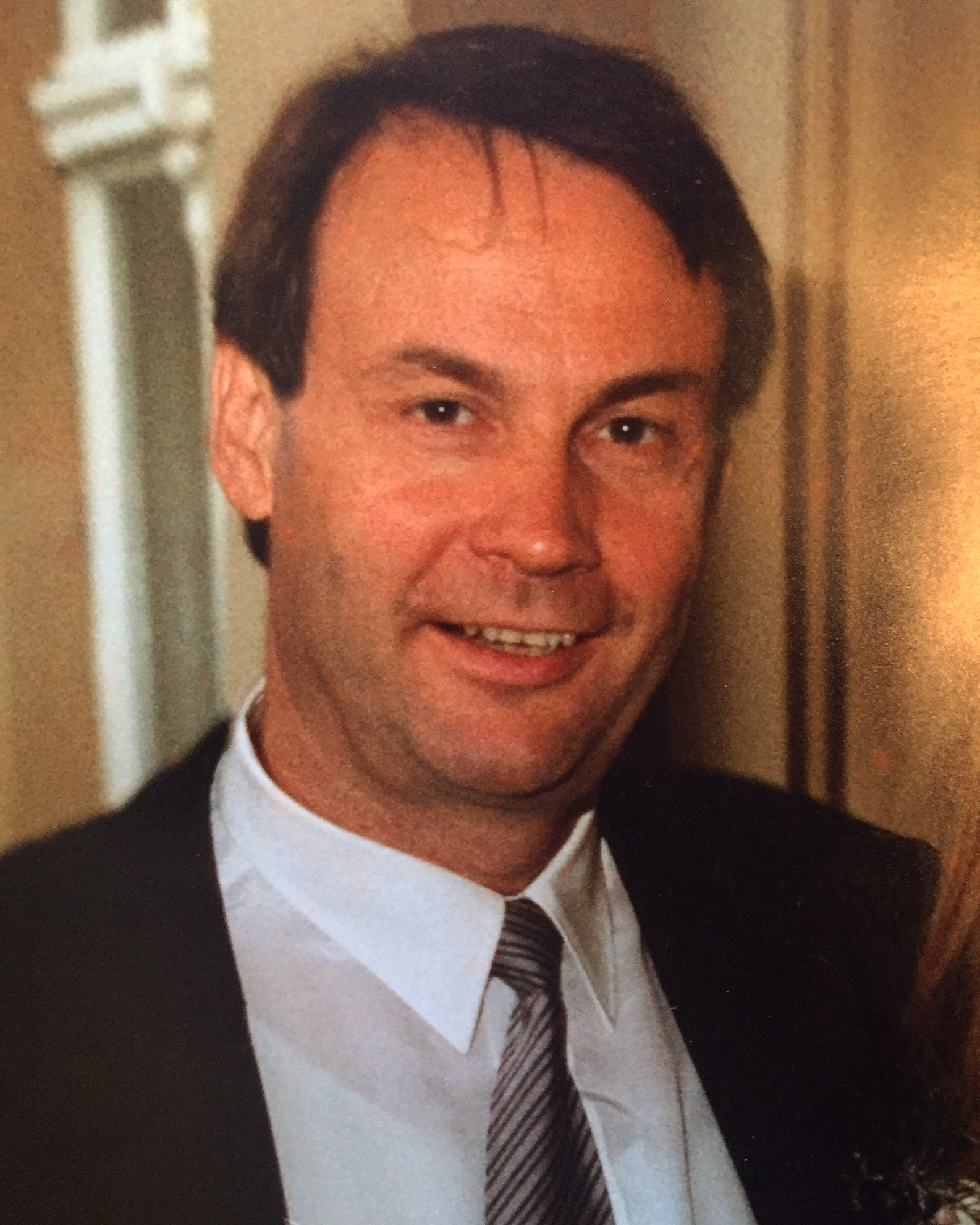
Konrad Seppelt (2018)

Konrad Seppelt (born September 2, 1944 in Leipzig) is an academic, author, professor and former vice president of the Free University of Berlin.

== Publications ==
=== Popular publications ===
- Cutting Edge, Konrad Seppelt, The (London) Times Higher Education Supplement, November 10, 2000, p. 24.
- The Future of Chemistry ... , Editorial, Angew. Chem. Int. Ed. 2004, 43, 3618 –3620
- Science, Isolation and structural and electronic characterization of salts of the decamethylferrocene dication. August 2016 12;353(6300):678-82
- Science, Xenon as a complex ligand: the tetra xenono Gold(II) cation in AuXe_{4}^{2+}(Sb_{2}F_{11}^{−})_{2}. 2000 Oct 6;290(5489):117-8.
- Science, Response: Structure of W(CH_{3})_{6}. 1996 Apr 12;272(5259):182b-3b.

=== Scientific publications ===
A random selection of Prof Seppelt's publications:

- K. Seppelt (1976). "Arsenic Pentachloride, AsCl_{5}". Angew. Chem. Int. Ed. Engl. 15 (6): 377–378. doi:10.1002/anie.197603771.
- Seppelt, Konrad (June 1979). "Recent Developments in the Chemistry of Some Electronegative Elements". Accounts of Chemical Research. 12 (6): 211–216. doi:10.1021/ar50138a004.
- Seppelt, K. “Selenoyl difluoride” Inorganic Syntheses, 1980, volume XX, pp. 36–38. ISBN 0-471-07715-1.
- Ali Reza Mahjoub; Xiongzhi Zhang; Konrad Seppelt (1995). "Reactions of the Naked Fluoride Ion: Syntheses and Structures of SeF_{6}^{2−} and BrF_{6}^{−}". Chemistry: A European Journal. 1 (4): 216. doi:10.1002/chem.19950010410.
- Seppelt, K., Pfennig, V. Science 1996, 271, 626-8.
- Kleinhenz, S., Pfennig, V., Seppelt, K. Chem. Eur. J. 1998, 4, 1687-91.
- Haupt S, Seppelt K (2002). "Solid State Structures of AsCl_{5} and SbCl_{5}". Zeitschrift für Anorganische und Allgemeine Chemie. 628 (4): 729–734. doi:10.1002/1521-3749(200205)628:4<729::AID-ZAAC729>3.0.CO;2-E.
- Konrad Seppelt, Stefan Seidel; Seppelt, K (2000-10-06). "Xenon as a Complex Ligand: The Tetra Xenono Gold(II) Cation in AuXe_{4}^{2+}(Sb_{2}F_{11}^{−})_{2}". Science. 290 (5489): 117–118. Bibcode:2000Sci...290..117S. doi:10.1126/science.290.5489.117. PMID 11021792.
- Hwang, I; Seppelt, K. (2000). "The structures of ReF_{8}^{−} and UF_{8}^{2−}". Journal of Fluorine Chemistry. 102 (1–2): 69–72. doi:10.1016/S0022-1139(99)00248-1.
- A. Ellern; T. Drews; K. Seppelt (2001). "The Structure of Carbon Suboxide, C_{3}O_{2}, in the Solid State". Zeitschrift für Anorganische und Allgemeine Chemie. 627 (1): 73–76. doi:10.1002/1521-3749(200101)627:1<73::AID-ZAAC73>3.0.CO;2-A.
- Seppelt, K. Accounts of Chemical Research 2003, 36(2), 147-153.
