= Chalcogen bond =

Net attractive interaction involving one of the chalcogen elements

In chemistry, a chalcogen bond (ChB) is an attractive interaction in the family of σ-hole interactions, along with halogen bonds. Electrostatic, charge-transfer (CT) and dispersion terms have been identified as contributing to this type of interaction. In terms of CT contribution, this family of attractive interactions has been modeled as an electron donor (the bond acceptor) interacting with the σ* orbital of a C-X bond (X= hydrogen, halogen, chalcogen, pnictogen, etc.) of the bond donor. In terms of electrostatic interactions, the molecular electrostatic potential (MEP) maps is often invoked to visualize the electron density of the donor and an electrophilic region on the acceptor, where the potential is depleted, referred to as a σ-hole. ChBs, much like hydrogen and halogen bonds, have been invoked in various non-covalent interactions, such as protein folding, crystal engineering, self-assembly, catalysis, transport, sensing, templation, and drug design.

== Bonding ==
=== Origin ===
Chalcogen bonding is comparable to other forms of σ-hole interactions. However, the specific contributions to this interaction are still a matter of debate. The contributing forces can be broken down into dispersion/van der Waals interactions, electrostatic interactions, and orbital mixing (CT) interactions. These contributing attractive forces are invoked to explain the differences in bonding strength associated with different donor-acceptor pairs. Some authors argue that electrostatic interactions dominate only in the case of harder chalcogen atoms as acceptors, specifically O and S. The chalcogen bonding of heavier group 16 congeners are thought to be attributable more to dispersion forces. In a separate camp, these contributions are considered minor compared to the orbital mixing/delocalization between the donor n orbital and acceptor σ* orbital.

Given the dual ability of chalcogens to serve as donor and acceptor molecules for σ-hole interactions, a geometric schematic has been generated to distinguish between the differing bonding character. The σ* orbital is exactly opposite the σ bonds to a chalcogen bond. It is the region between the σ-holes in which the lone pairs localize in a donor region. These regions have been referred to as the nucleophilic gate, the σ-hole regions which are electron depleted, and the electrophilic gate, the donor region which is electron enriched.

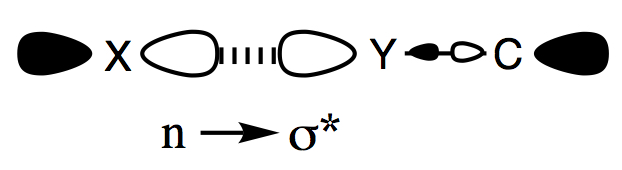
Orbital mixing picture for n → σ* interaction as seen in various σ-hole interactions.

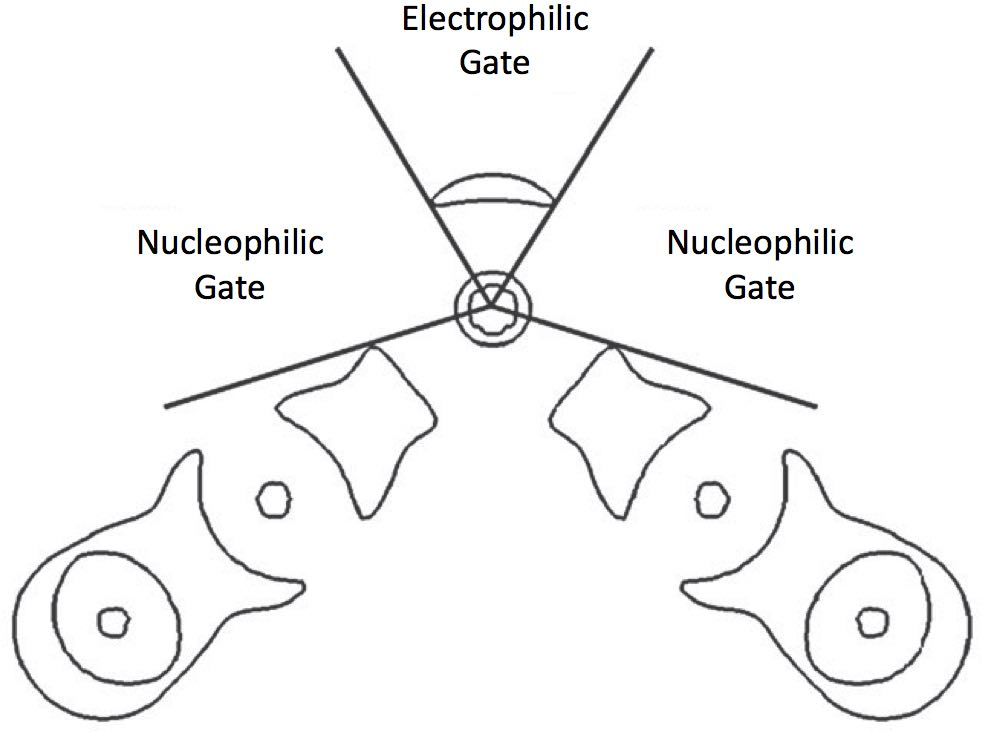
Visualization of the nucleophilic and electrophilic gates on S(CN)_{2}.

=== Evaluation ===
==== AIM ====
Any electron donor can donate electrons into the σ-hole of a bonded chalcogen, including halogen anions, amines, and π electrons (such as benzene). Similar to halogen bonding, chalcogen bonding can occur between two chalcogens, resulting in a chalcogen-chalcogen bond. Non-covalent interactions are well characterized by Bader's atoms in molecules (AIM) model which defines a bond as any bond-critical point (BCP) existing between two nuclei. This can be understood simply as a saddle point on an electron density map of a molecule. Hydrogen and halogen bonds are both well characterized by this method. The same analysis has been performed on chalcogen bonds, as shown below. The BCP's between S and Cl^{−} in these molecules are evidence of the non-covalent interactions, in this case chalcogen-halogen bonds.

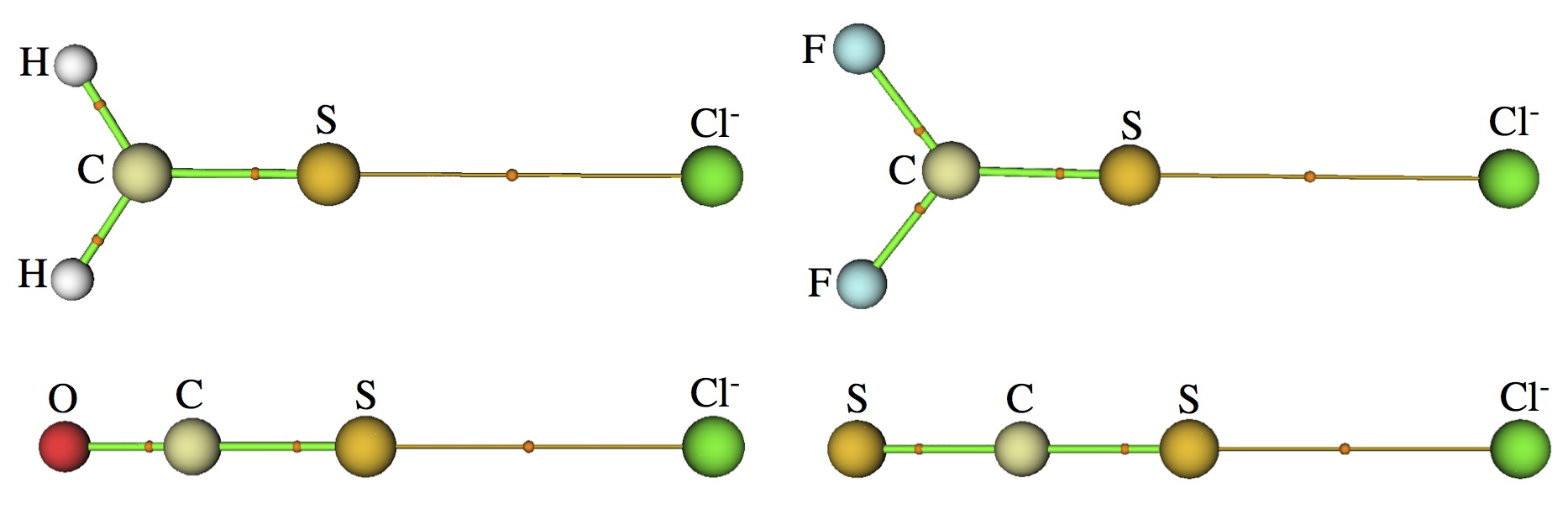
Atoms in molecules (AIM) analysis on various chalcogen-halogen bond containing systems. Bond critical points (BCP) evidence the chalcogen bond between S and Cl^{−}.

==== NBO ====
Another method used to evaluate chalcogen bonding specifically and a wide range of bonding generally is natural bond orbital (NBO) analysis. NBO analysis distinguishes between covalent, Lewis-type bonding interactions and non-covalent, non-Lewis bonding interaction. The chalcogen bond will be evaluated based on the natural population of the n → σ* orbital. A higher population of this orbital should then also be reflected in changes in the geometry.

==== Geometry ====
Both electrostatic mapping and molecular orbital explanation for chalcogen bonding result in a predicted directionality for the bonding interaction. In a hydrogen or halogen bond, the electrophilic region/σ* orbital are located opposite the σ bond, forming a single σ-hole. Optimal hydrogen or halogen bonds thus are linear in geometry. Chalcogen bonding is a result of the same interaction. However, it is possible for chalcogens to form multiple sigma bonds and thus multiple σ-holes to form such bonding interactions. Evaluations of x-ray crystal structures or structure determinations based on vibrational spectroscopy can provide evidence for chalcogen bonding based on proximity and orientation of atoms. Surveys of the Cambridge Structural Database have revealed a high frequency of likely chalcogen bonding interactions in protein structures and solid state crystals of molecules.

=== H-bonding vs. chalcogen bonding ===
Due to a chalcogen's ability to function as an electron donor, many systems will balance between hydrogen bonding with the chalcogen as a donor or chalcogen bonding. This balance can be observed in a series of self-bonding intermolecular interactions between various substituted chalcogens. In cases with hard chalcogen atoms as acceptors, the balance favors H-bonding between chalcogen and methyl H. However, as the acceptor atoms move down the group, chalcogen-chalcogen bonding will be favored. It is hypothesized that electrostatic forces should only dominate in a chalcogen-chalcogen bond with lighter congeners, and instead that dispersion forces dominate in the cases of heavier congeners

A means of comparing the chalcogen-chalcogen bonding forces with H-bonding is to compare the effect of various solvent environments on the chalcogen-chalcogen bond. This has been done on a series of molecules featuring a chalcogen-chalcogen intramolecular bond in one conformation (closed) and exposed to solvent interactions in another (open). One such study found that the preference for the closed conformation showed almost no dependence on the solvent environment. This was taken to mean that changes in solvent dipole moment, polarizability, or H-bonding character did not influence the balance between chalcogen-chalcogen bonding and solvent interactions. Such a conclusion would mean that the dispersion forces and electrostatic forces involved in chalcogen-chalcogen bonding do not majorly influence the interaction. Instead, this would mean that the orbital interaction dominates the bonding interaction.

== Applications ==
=== Drug Design ===
In drug design chalcogen heterocycles have been used as chalcogen bond acceptors. It is hypothesized that intramolecular chalcogen bonding out competes intermolecular interactions since divalent sulfur will direct σ* orbitals at angles flanking the molecule rather than directly outward as is seen in halogen bonding.

=== Catalysis ===
Chalcogen bonding in catalysis has been used to pre-orient substrate, allowing for asymmetric/stereoselective catalysis on the preferred conformation of the substrate. Examples include an asymmetric acyl transfer on an enantiomeric mixture catalyzed by a chiral isothiourea. The acyl group is first transfer on to the chiral catalyst which is purported to go through a transition state featuring a 1,5 chalcogen bonding interaction on the catalyst which orients the acyl group prior to transfer on to the substrate. This resulted in one enantiomer of the substrate acylated and the remaining substrate enriched in the other enantiomer.

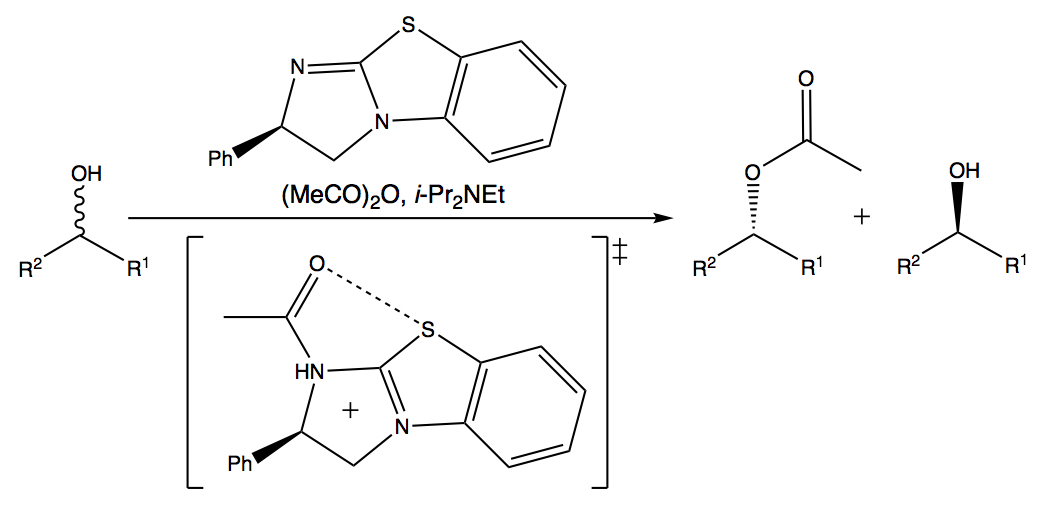
Stereoselective acyl transfer via an isothiourea catalyst.
