= Pierangelo Metrangolo =

Italian chemist

- Born: 16 April 1972 (age 54); Lecce, Italy
- Children: 2
- Scientific career
- Education: University of Milan
- Known for: Halogen Bonding
- Awards: ERC Grantee (2012)
- Fields: Biomimetic materials; Crystal Engineering; Supramolecular chemistry
- Workplaces: Politecnico di Milano; National Research Council (Italy); Aalto University (Finland); VTT Technical Research Centre of Finland
- Thesis: Halogen Bonding in Supramolecular Chemistry (2001)
- Website: www.cmic.polimi.it

Pierangelo Metrangolo (born 16 April 1972) is an Italian chemist with interests in supramolecular chemistry and functional materials. He also has an interest in crystal engineering, in particular by using the halogen bond. He is past-president of the Physical and Biophysical Chemistry Division (DIV. I) of IUPAC.

== Education and professional positions ==
Metrangolo was born in Lecce, Italy. He obtained his PhD in Industrial Chemistry at the University of Milan in 2001 with a thesis on halogen bonding in supramolecular chemistry. He became assistant professor at the Politecnico di Milano in 2002, where he was promoted to associate professor in 2005 and to full professor of chemistry for technologies in 2011. He is also affiliated to the National Research Council of Italy and holds a visiting professorship at the Aalto University (Finland, since 2015) and at the VTT-Technical Research Centre of Finland (since 2011).

== Research interests ==
His research interests have covered the following topics:

- functional supramolecular materials
- fluorinated nanoparticles and theranostics
- biomimetic and biosynthetic hybrid materials
- intermolecular forces and their use in crystal engineering
- nanomedicine

== Honors and awards ==
- ERC Grantee (2012, European Research Council)
- CrystEngComm Sponsored Lectureship at the 42nd IUPAC World Chemistry Congress (2009)
- Young Observer at the 45th IUPAC General Assembly (2009)
- Journals Grant Award for International Authors (2005, Royal Society of Chemistry)
- G. Ciamician Medal (2005, Italian Chemical Society)
- Titular Member of the IUPAC's Division I Physical and Biophysical Chemistry (2016–2017)
- Co-editor of Acta Crystallographica B (International Union of Crystallography) (2014 onwards)
- Member of the editorial board of CrystEngComm (Royal Society of Chemistry) (2013 onwards)
- Member of the editorial advisory board of Crystal Growth & Design (American Chemical Society) (2014 onwards)
