= Rosalind Franklin: The Dark Lady of DNA =

Book by Brenda Maddox

- Author: Brenda Maddox
- Language: English
- Subject: Rosalind Franklin
- Published: 2002
- Publisher: HarperCollins
- Publication place: United Kingdom
- Media type: Print (Hardcover and Paperback)
- ISBN: 978-0-060-98508-0
- OCLC: 877900721

Rosalind Franklin: The Dark Lady of DNA is a biography of Rosalind Franklin, a scientist whose work helped discover the structure of DNA. It was written by Brenda Maddox and published by HarperCollins in October 2002.

A play based in part on the book, Photograph 51 written by Anna Ziegler, was staged in London in 2015 starring Nicole Kidman.

== Awards ==
The book received the 2002 Los Angeles Times Book Prize for Science and Technology. It was also awarded the Marsh Biography Award in 2003, and was shortlisted for the 2002 Whitbread Biography Award.

== See also ==
- Rosalind Franklin and DNA by her friend Anne Sayre
