= Stephen Campbell Moore =

British actor

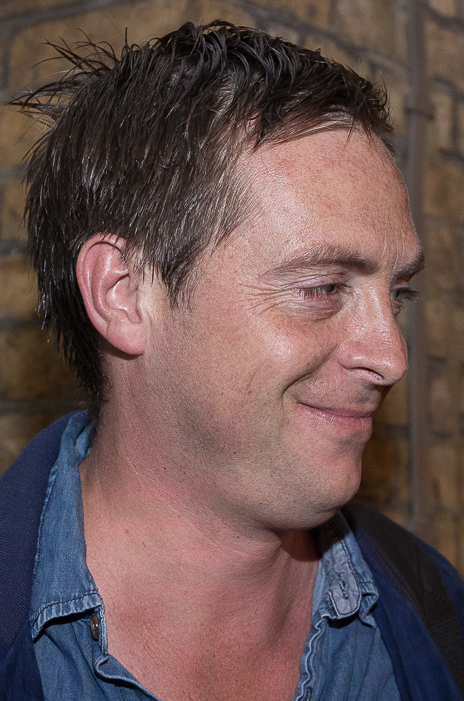
- Campbell Moore at the Noël Coward Theatre in Photograph 51
- Born: Stephen Moore Thorpe; 1977 (age 48–49); Hendon, Greater London
- Education: Guildhall School of Music and Drama
- Occupation: Actor
- Years active: 2003–present
- Spouse: Claire Foy (m. 2014; sep. 2018)
- Partner: Sophie Cookson (2018–present)
- Children: 2

Stephen Campbell Moore (born Stephen Moore Thorpe; 1977) is a British actor. He is best known for his roles in Alan Bennett's play The History Boys and the film based on it. He has starred in several TV series, including War of the Worlds (2019–2021).

== Early life and education ==
Stephen Campbell Moore was born in 1978 or 1979 in London as Stephen Moore Thorpe.

He was educated at Berkhamsted School in Hertfordshire and trained at the Guildhall School of Music and Drama, alongside Orlando Bloom, where he was awarded the gold medal in his final year.

== Career ==
Campbell Moore made his screen debut in Stephen Fry's Bright Young Things. On stage he has performed with the RSC and the Royal National Theatre.

He created the role of Irwin in the original West End stage production of Alan Bennett's play The History Boys, and also played the character in the Broadway, Sydney, Wellington, and Hong Kong productions, and in the film version of the play. Bennett, participating in a Q&A with the play's director, Nicholas Hytner, said: "I think, of the three teachers, Stephen Campbell Moore, who plays Irwin, has the hardest job because he doesn't have the audience's sympathy until two-thirds of the way through the second act. Both Hector and Mrs Lintott have the audience on their side whereas he – who is teaching and getting results, which, in the ordinary way, parents would approve of – is not thought to be sympathetic until he reveals himself as quite vulnerable. That came as a surprise to me when I saw it rehearsed. In a sense, it takes the actors to show you what you've written". Reviewing the play for The Guardian in May 2004, Michael Billington wrote: "Stephen Campbell Moore makes Irwin both meretricious in his methods, yet effective in his results".

In 2004, he starred as Lord Darlington alongside Scarlett Johansson in A Good Woman, based on Lady Windermere's Fan by Oscar Wilde, shot on location in Italy. In the same year, Campbell Moore played the part of Hugh Stanbury in Andrew Davies' BBC adaptation of Anthony Trollope's novel He Knew He Was Right.

In 2005, he starred as Edward VIII alongside Joely Richardson as Wallis Simpson in the British television drama Wallis & Edward. In 2008, he appeared in one episode of the television series Lark Rise to Candleford as headteacher James Delafield, featuring alongside star Julia Sawalha, and had a regular role in the BBC series Ashes to Ashes. He worked on the ABC miniseries Ben-Hur in 2009, and appeared in the 2011 film Season of the Witch. In 2012, he starred as Titus in Jean Racine's Berenice, alongside Anne-Marie Duff in the title role, at the Donmar Warehouse in London.

Campbell Moore played the role of Viscount Hugh Trimingham in the BBC's 2015 adaptation of L. P. Hartley's novel The Go-Between.

The same year, he played the role of Maurice Wilkins in Anna Ziegler's play Photograph 51, with Michael Billington writing: "The play is also anything but a one-person show. Stephen Campbell Moore catches perfectly the obduracy and awkwardness of Maurice Wilkins, forever tugging at his slightly too-long sleeves".

In 2017, he stayed in the cast of the BBC series The Last Post despite learning shortly before the start of filming that he required surgery for a brain tumour.

An August 2018 announcement indicated that Campbell Moore would be among the new cast to join the original actors in the feature film Downton Abbey, which started principal photography at about the same time.

== Recognition and awards ==
Campbell Moore was nominated for a 2006 Drama Desk Award for his work on the Broadway production of The History Boys.

== Personal life ==
Campbell Moore underwent surgery to remove brain tumours in 2012 and 2017.

He married actress Claire Foy in 2014, having met while working together on the film Season of the Witch. They have a daughter together. In February 2018, Foy confirmed that the couple had separated.

In 2017, he met actress Sophie Cookson on the set of Red Joan; they reportedly began dating in November 2018. They have one child together.

== Credits ==
=== Theatre ===
| Year | Title | Role | Venue |
|---|---|---|---|
| 2004–2006 | The History Boys | Irwin | Lyttelton Theatre, Royal National Theatre, South Bank (2004–5); Lyric Theatre, Hong Kong Academy for Performing Arts (2006); St. James Theatre, Wellington (2006); Sydney Theatre Company, Sydney (2006); Broadhurst Theatre, Broadway (2006) |
| 2010 | All My Sons | Chris Keller | Apollo Theatre, West End, London |
| 2011 | Clybourne Park | | Wyndham's Theatre, West End, London |
| 2012 | Berenice | | Donmar Warehouse, West End, London |
| 2013 | Chimerica | Joe Schofield | Almeida Theatre, London |
| 2015 | Photograph 51 | Maurice Wilkins | Noël Coward Theatre, London |
| 2023 | When Winston Went to War with the Wireless | John Reith | Donmar Warehouse, London |

=== Film ===
| Year | Title | Role | Notes |
|---|---|---|---|
| 2003 | Bright Young Things | Adam Fenwick-Symes | |
| 2004 | A Good Woman | Lord Darlington | |
| 2006 | Amazing Grace | James Stephen | |
| 2006 | The History Boys | Irwin | |
| 2008 | The Bank Job | Kevin Swain | |
| 2008 | Burlesque Fairytales | Peter Blythe-Smith | |
| 2008 | The Children | Jonah | |
| 2011 | Season of the Witch | Debelzaq | |
| 2011 | Johnny English Reborn | The Prime Minister | |
| 2015 | Man Up | Ed | |
| 2015 | The Lady in the Van | Doctor | |
| 2015 | The Ones Below | Justin | |
| 2015 | Burnt | Jack | |
| 2017 | Goodbye Christopher Robin | Ernest Shepard | |
| 2018 | Red Joan | Max | |
| 2019 | Downton Abbey | Major Chetwode | |
| 2023 | Freud's Last Session | J. R. R. Tolkien | |
| 2024 | The Union | Cameron Foster | |
| 2026 | De Gaulle | Harold Macmillan | |

=== Television ===
| Year | Title | Role | Notes |
|---|---|---|---|
| 2003 | Byron | John Cam Hobhouse | Miniseries, 2 episodes |
| 2004 | He Knew He Was Right | Hugh Stanbury | Miniseries, 4 episodes |
| 2005 | Wallis & Edward | Edward VIII | Television film |
| 2006 | Hustle | Quenton Cornfoot | 1 episode |
| 2008 | Lark Rise to Candleford | James Delafield | 1 episode |
| 2008 | Ashes to Ashes | Evan White | Recurring role, 8 episodes |
| 2009 | A Short Stay in Switzerland | Edward | Television film |
| 2010 | Ben Hur | Messala | Miniseries, 2 episodes |
| 2011 | Just Henry | Joseph Dodge | Television film |
| 2012 | Titanic | Thomas Andrews | Miniseries, 4 episodes |
| 2012 | Hunted | Stephen Turner | Miniseries, 8 episodes |
| 2013 | Complicit | Tony Coveney | Television film |
| 2013 | The Wrong Mans | Smoke | Recurring role, 5 episodes |
| 2014 | Our Zoo | Reverend Aaron Webb | Main role, 6 episodes |
| 2015 | The Go-Between | Viscount Hugh Trimingham | Television film |
| 2016 | Stag | Johnners | Miniseries, 3 episodes |
| 2017 | The Child in Time | Charles | Television film |
| 2017 | The Last Post | Lieutenant Ed Laithwaite | Main role, 6 episodes |
| 2018 | Action Team | Agent 49 | 1 episode |
| 2019 | Traitors | Phillip Jarvis | Miniseries, 2 episodes |
| 2019 | Responsible Child | Dr. Johann Keaton | Television film |
| 2019–2021 | War of the Worlds | Jonathon Gresham | Main role, 15 episodes |
| 2021 | The One | Damien Brown | Main role, 8 episodes |
| 2022 | Anne | Edward Fitzgerald | Miniseries, 1 episode |
| 2022 | The Confessions of Frannie Langton | George Benham | Miniseries, 4 episodes |
| 2022 | Litvinenko | Ben Emmerson | Miniseries, 1 episode |
| 2023 | The Gold | Tony Lundy | 1 episode |
| 2024 | Criminal Record | Leo Hanratty | Main role, 13 episodes |
| 2024 | Masters of the Air | Major Marvin "Red" Bowman | Miniseries, 8 episodes |
| 2025 | Little Disasters | Rob | Miniseries, 6 episodes |
| 2026 | Industry | Tony Day | 1 episode |
| TBA | The Siege | TBA | Upcoming drama series |

=== Video game ===
| Year | Title | Role | Company | Notes |
|---|---|---|---|---|
| 2015 | Final Fantasy XIV: Heavensward | Regula van Hydrus | Square Enix | |
