= Mering (disambiguation) =

Mering may refer to:

- Mering, a city in Germany
  - Mering station
- Friedrich Mering (1822-1887), a physician in Russian Empire
- Joseph von Mering (1849-1908), a German physician
- Jacques Mering (1904-1973), a French engineer
- Alfred Mering (1936-1988), an Estonian actor
- Wiesław Mering (b. 1945), a Polish bishop
- Natalie Mering (b. 1988), an American singer known as Weyes Blood

== See also ==
- Mehring (disambiguation)
