= Carolyn Cohen =

- Born: June 18, 1929; United States
- Died: December 20, 2017 (aged 88)
- Occupations: Biologist, Biophysicist

Carolyn Cohen (June 18, 1929 – December 20, 2017) was an American biologist and biophysicist. She was a Fellow of the American Academy of Arts and Sciences.

== Early life and education ==
Carolyn Cohen was born June 18, 1929, to parents Anna and Philip Cohen. After Cohen's father died in 1939, she credited his lawyer Samuel Sumner Goldberg for mentoring her and nurturing her curiosity. Cohen attended Joan of Arc Junior High School, then the selective Hunter College High School. After rejections from McGill University and Barnard College, Cohen's French teacher urged her to apply to Bryn Mawr College, where she was accepted with a full-tuition scholarship. In the summer of 1949, Cohen took a job in the kitchen of the Marine Biological Laboratory at Woods Hole, MA. There she met Shinya Inoué, worked for Otto Schmitt, and attended a lecture by Dorothy Wrinch that she later credited with stimulating her career interest in protein structures. Cohen completed her Bachelor of Arts in Biology and Physics from Bryn Mawr in 1950, graduating summa cum laude. She then moved to Massachusetts Institute of Technology, for a PhD under the supervision of Richard S. Bear. There she worked on the structure of collagen and other helically structured proteins, completing her degree in 1954.

While at MIT, Cohen met then-visiting researcher Jean Hanson, who was working on the structure of muscle fibers. After graduation Cohen took a postdoctoral researcher position in Hanson's laboratory at King's College London, working on the X-ray crystallography structure of actin filaments. After nine months, Cohen returned to MIT working first in Bear's lab, then with Andrew Szent-Györgyi on the structure of fibrous proteins. She enrolled in medical school at Boston University, but left after less than a month, returning to full-time research at MIT. In 1957, she began what would become a long collaboration with Donald Caspar, investigating the structure of tropomyosin.

== Academic career ==
In 1958, Cohen started her own laboratory, co-led by Caspar, at the Children's Cancer Research Foundation (now the Dana–Farber Cancer Institute). There she worked primarily on the structure of myosin. With postdoctoral fellow Susan Lowey, Cohen predicted a model for the myosin structure with an alpha-helical core bookended by globular masses. Studying the catch muscle in molluscs, Cohen and Kenneth Holmes (then a postdoctoral researcher with Caspar) demonstrated the presence of alpha-helical coiled coil filaments, published in 1963. A few years later in 1967, Lowey and Henry S. Slater confirmed the predicted globular heads by electron microscopy. From 1969 to 1972, Cohen and Caspar published a series of papers describing the structure of tropomyosin – the first protein structure determined by electron microscopy.

In 1972, Cohen, Caspar, and Lowe – together called the "Structural Biology Laboratory" – moved their laboratory to become the first research group at Brandeis University's Rosenstiel Basic Medical Sciences Research Center. In fact, Cohen was the first tenured woman in Biology at Brandeis University.

Cohen retired from Brandeis in 2012.

In honor of her work surrounding protein structures, in 2022 the Biophysical Society Innovation Award was renamed to the Carolyn Cohen Award for Biophysical Innovation. It has since been presented every year at the BPS Annual Meeting in February.

== Awards and honors ==
- Fellow, American Academy of Arts and Sciences
- Member, National Academy of Sciences
- 2000, Biophysical Society Founder's Award for her accomplishments in Biophysics
