= Möhring =

Möhring is a German surname. Notable people with the surname include:

- Anke Möhring (born 1969), East German swimmer
- Charlotte Möhring (1887 - 1970), German aviator
- Cornelia Möhring (born 1960), German politician
- Dennis Möhring (born 1976), German politician
- Günther Möhring (1936-2006), German chess player
- Herbert Mohring (1928–2012), University of Minnesota transportation economist
- Mike Mohring (born 1971), German politician (CDU)
- Mike Mohring (born 1974), American football player
- Paul Möhring (1710 - 1792), German physician, botanist and zoologist

== See also ==
- Mehr (name)
- Mehring (disambiguation)
- Mohr; Möhrle (Möhrke), Mohren, Mohrmann
