= Scientists, Technologists and Artists Generating Exploration =

Scientists, Technologists and Artists Generating Exploration (STAGE) was created in 2005 to encourage collaboration between artists and scientists. Originally, it began as a partnership between the Professional Artists Lab and the California NanoSystems Institute at the University of California, Santa Barbara. STAGE, which is housed at California NanoSystems Institute, hosts a biennial international script competition and a Collaboratory.

The founder and director of STAGE is Nancy Kawalek, a Studio Professor at the University of California, Santa Barbara.

== Script Competition ==
The STAGE International Script Competition awards a $10,000 prize to the best new play about science and technology.

=== Past Judges ===
A panel of artists and scientists serve as jurors for each cycle of the competition. Judges have included

- Pulitzer Prize- and Tony Award-winning playwright David Auburn
- Tony-, Oliver-, and Obie Award–winning playwright John Guare
- Pulitzer Prize–winning playwright David Lindsay-Abaire
- Nobel laureate in physics Sir Anthony Leggett, KBE
- Nobel laureate in chemistry Alan Heeger
- Nobel laureate in physics David Gross

=== Past winners ===
Playwrights who have won the competition include

- Jamie Pachino for Splitting Infinity
- Elyse Singer for Frequency Hopping
- Anna Ziegler for Photograph 51
- Craig Baxter for The Altruists

== The Collaboratory ==
In 2009, STAGE launched The Collaboratory, an artistic laboratory for the development of theatrical works that have a multi-media component and that feature science and technology. The first play being created in The Collaboratory is The Brain Project.

=== The Brain Project ===
Participants of The Brain Project include

- Alyssa Anderson
- Dwier Brown
- Michael Gazzaniga, PhD
- Angela Goethals
- Scott Grafton, MD
- Geoffrey Grinstein, PhD
- Nancy Kawalek
- Kenneth Kosik, MD
- James Lashly
- Maurizio Seracini, PhD
- Deb Norton
