= Kenneth Holmes =

British molecular biologist (1934–2021)

Kenneth Charles Holmes FRS
- Born: 19 November 1934; Hammersmith, London
- Died: 2 November 2021 (aged 86)
- Education: St John's College, Cambridge (BA), Birkbeck College (PhD)
- Known for: Pioneering analyses of biological structures and viruses, Aaron Klug – A Long Way from Durban: a Biography
- Awards: Gabor Medal of the Royal Society
- Scientific career
- Fields: Molecular biology, X-ray radiation
- Workplaces: Harvard Medical School; Laboratory of Molecular Biology, Cambridge; Max Planck Institute for Medical Research, Heidelberg
- Doctoral advisors: Rosalind Franklin, Aaron Klug, John Finch
- Other academic advisors: Donald Caspar, Carolyn Cohen

Kenneth Charles Holmes FRS (19 November 1934 – 2 November 2021) was a British molecular biologist and a pioneer in using synchrotron X-ray radiation to study biology.

== Education and career ==
Holmes was born on 19 November 1934 in Hammersmith, London and attended the Chiswick School in London. He entered University of Cambridge and studied at St John's College, Cambridge, where he received a BA. He then returned to London and studied at Birkbeck College for his PhD on the structure of the tobacco mosaic virus, during which he worked with Rosalind Franklin, Aaron Klug and John Finch. After a one-year postdoc research at the Boston Children's Hospital of the Harvard Medical School with Donald Caspar and Carolyn Cohen, Holmes moved to the Laboratory of Molecular Biology, University of Cambridge in 1962, where he became a research scientist in the group of Hugh Huxley until 1968. Holmes then moved to Heidelberg, where he established the Department of Biophysics at the Max Planck Institute for Medical Research. He remained a director there until his retirement in 2003. From 1975 and 1976, Holmes was acting head of the EMBL outstation, the Synchrotron Radiation Laboratory at DESY, Hamburg. After his retirement, Holmes became an "Emeritus Scientific Member" at the Max Planck Institute for Medical Research.

In 1981, Holmes was elected a Fellow of the Royal Society, and was awarded their 1997 Gabor Medal which is of silver gilt and then accompanied by 1,000 pounds "in recognition of his achievements in molecular biology, in particular his pioneering analyses of biological structures and viruses, and his development of the use of synchrotron radiation for X-ray diffraction experiments, now a widely used technique not only in molecular biology but in physics and materials science".

He was awarded both the European Latsis Prize worth 100,000 Swiss Francs in 2000 based on his work on "Molecular Structure", and the Gregori Aminoff Prize of the Royal Swedish Academy of Sciences in 2001.

His scientific biography of Sir Aaron Klug, "Aaron Klug - A Long Way from Durban: A Biography" was published in 2017 by Cambridge University Press. In 2021, he received the Lennart Philipson Award.

Holmes died on 2 November 2021, at the age of 86.
