= Anne Sayre =

American writer

- Born: Anne Colquhoun; April 10, 1923; Milwaukee, Wisconsin, US
- Died: March 13, 1998 (aged 74); Bridgewater Township, New Jersey
- Education: BL
- Alma mater: New York University Law School
- Occupations: Writer biographer lawyer
- Spouse: David Sayre (m. 1947)
- Writing career
- Language: English
- Years active: 1946–1975
- Genres: Short stories biography
- Notable works: Rosalind Franklin and DNA (1975)
- Movement: Feminism

Anne Sayre (née Colquhoun; April 10, 1923 – March 13, 1998) was an American writer well known for her biography of Rosalind Franklin, one of the discoverers of the structure of DNA.

She was married to an American crystallographer David Sayre (1924–2012).

Her literary contributions are in short stories, the earnings from which she supported her husband during his PhD course. She achieved her lifelong educational ambition of getting a law degree in her early 50s. She ultimately became justice of the local court in Head of the Harbor, New York. She was a lifelong friend of Franklin, who played a key role in the discovery of the chemical structure of DNA. A strong feminist, her 1975 book, Rosalind Franklin and DNA, became an exposition of the account of sexism in the scientific community on one hand, and the true genius of Rosalind Franklin in her contributions to molecular biology on the other hand.

== Biography ==
Anne Sayre was "born on a train passing through Milwaukee". She spent her childhood in Woodmere, New York, and was educated at Radcliffe College. But the Second World War prevented her to pursue law, her main ambition. To render her service in the war, she worked in the Radiation Laboratory at Massachusetts Institute of Technology. Her job there was managing the supply of special-design transformers. She never really knew what transformers were. She took the job for only a few months, but she met her future husband, David Sayre. (David Sayre was a physics student who also volunteered for war service during his academic break.) They got married in 1947. Married to a scientist, she described herself as "a camp-follower to the scientists".

She soon took up a writing career, mainly of short stories, of which many were included in the Foley's and the Best American Short Stories collections. In 1949, they moved to England as David Sayre was enrolled for a DPhil at the University of Oxford to work under Dorothy Hodgkin (a 1964 Nobel laureate). Anne Sayre financially supported most of their financial expenses through her writings. She eventually got appointed as an editor at the Oxford University Press. David received his DPhil in 1951, and in September they returned to the U.S.

In 1975, she revived her ambition to become a lawyer and got enrolled in New York University Law School, from where she graduated with high grades. She devoted her service in legal matters, particularly concerning environment, in Long Island.

She initially served as volunteer Legal Aid lawyer in Riverhead. Later, she was appointed justice in the Head of the Harbor, a post she held until illness prompted her to resign in 1996. Since the late 1980s she had suffered from pneumonia and the complications of scleroderma, a rare form of rheumatism. She died on March 13, 1998, in a hospital near her home in Bridgewater Township, New Jersey, and was survived by her husband.

== Rosalind Franklin and her biography ==
Anne Sayre first met Rosalind Franklin in 1949 at Laboratoire Central des Services Chimiques de l'État in Paris, where Franklin was working, and when she and her husband was visiting. From then on she remained one of Franklin's closest friends. While she and her husband lived in Oxford, Franklin frequently met her whenever he visited England. When they moved to US, Franklin visited them several times when she attended scientific conferences. They regularly exchanged letters when they lived apart in different continents until the end of 1957, as Franklin developed ovarian cancer.

In October 1957, Franklin underwent her second operation. By that time Sayre was visiting around England and Scotland. She stayed with Franklin at the hospital and looked after Franklin's apartment. When Franklin was discharged from hospital, Sayre nursed her in a rented cottage for some days. After recovery, she left her in London and headed home to New York. This was the last time they met. On October 8, 1957, Franklin wrote to her that she was invited to a phytopathology conference at Bloomington, Indiana, and that she planned to stay with Sayre on her way in New York. This was their last communication. Franklin never fully recovered and died on April 16, 1958.

Franklin's X-ray crystallography of DNA (dubbed Photo 51) was the key data in the discovery of DNA structure, for which James Watson, Francis Crick and Maurice Wilkins won the 1962 Nobel Prize for Physiology or Medicine. After death, Franklin was largely forgotten outside the scientific community.

However, her importance surfaced when Watson published his memoir The Double Helix: A Personal Account of the Discovery of the Structure of DNA in 1968. Although the DNA research centred on Franklin, Watson mostly portrayed her as "uninteresting", "belligerent", "sharp, stubborn mind", with her dresses showing "all the imagination of English blue-stocking adolescents", "the product of an unsatisfied mother", a physical bully, and always referring to her as "Rosy", the name she never appreciated.

After reading the book, Sayre felt that Franklin was grossly misrepresented in her personal qualities. She called The Double Helix as "every known prejudice against intellectual women". She quickly started researching for materials, and after five years, she published Rosalind Franklin and DNA in 1975, which she claimed not as a biography, but as a protest to Watson's. These two books became the posthumous fame for Franklin. However, Sayre's book has been criticized for its purported attempt to make Franklin as a feminist icon, and wrongly representing sexism of the time.

== Recognition ==
College of Engineering and Applied Sciences, Stony Brook University, has Anne Sayre Prize for students. The prize carries $500 and a copy of Anne Sayre's book.

== Books ==
- Sayre, Anne (1987) [1975]. Rosalind Franklin and DNA. New York: W.W. Norton & Company, Inc. ISBN 0-393-32044-8.
- Sayre, Anne (1957). Never Call Retreat. Crowell. ASIN B0007E7CO6.
