= Rosalind (education platform) =

- Website type: Educational
- Available in: English
- Owners: University of California, San Diego; Saint Petersburg Academic University; Russian Academy of Sciences
- Website: http://rosalind.info
- Commercial: No
- Registration: Free, optional
- Launched: July 25, 2012
- Current status: Online

Rosalind is an educational resource and web project for learning bioinformatics through problem solving and computer programming. Rosalind users learn bioinformatics concepts through a problem tree that builds up biological, algorithmic, and programming knowledge concurrently or learn by topics, with the topic of Alignment, Combinatorics, Computational Mass Spectrometry, Heredity, Population Dynamics and so on. Each problem is checked automatically, allowing for the project to also be used for automated homework testing in existing classes.

Rosalind is a joint project between the University of California, San Diego and Saint Petersburg Academic University along with the Russian Academy of Sciences. The project's name commemorates Rosalind Franklin, whose X-ray crystallography with Raymond Gosling facilitated the discovery of the DNA double helix by James D. Watson and Francis Crick. It was recognized by Homolog.us as the Best Educational Resource of 2012 in their review of the Top Bioinformatics Contributions of 2012. As of July 2022, it hosts over 88,000 problem solvers.

Rosalind was used to teach the first Bioinformatics Algorithms MOOC on Coursera in 2013, including interactive learning materials hosted on Stepic.
