= Photograph 51 (play) =

2008 play written by Anna Ziegler

- The titular Photo 51
- Original language: English
- Written by: Anna Ziegler
- Characters: Rosalind Franklin; Maurice Wilkins; James Watson; Francis Crick; Raymond Gosling; Donald Caspar
- Genre: Play
- Setting: King's College London; London

Premiere
- Date: 5 September 2015
- Place: Noël Coward Theatre, London

Photograph 51 is a play by Anna Ziegler. Photograph 51 opened in the West End of London in September 2015. The play focuses on the often-overlooked role of X-ray crystallographer Rosalind Franklin in the discovery of the double helix structure of DNA while working at King's College London. This play won the third STAGE International Script Competition in 2008. The title comes from Photo 51, the nickname given to an X-ray diffraction image taken by Raymond Gosling in May, 1952, under the supervision of Rosalind Franklin. The one-act play runs for 95 minutes with no intermission.

Photograph 51 was commissioned, developed, and given its world premiere under the direction of Mary Resing by Active Cultures Theatre in Maryland in 2008. That year, it also won the 2008 STAGE (Scientists, Technologists and Artists Generating Exploration) International script competition for Best New Play. Photograph 51 had subsequent productions at The Fountain Theatre in Los Angeles, Ensemble Studio Theatre in New York, Theater J in Washington DC, Seattle Repertory Theatre in Seattle, amongst many others, then in London's Noël Coward Theatre, in the West End, directed by Michael Grandage. The play premiered in Australia in Melbourne in 2019.

== Cast ==
The original cast of the London play:

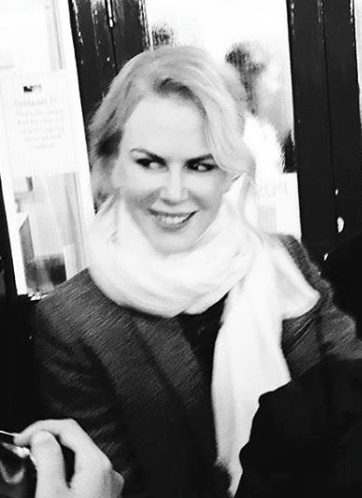
Nicole Kidman starred as Rosalind Franklin

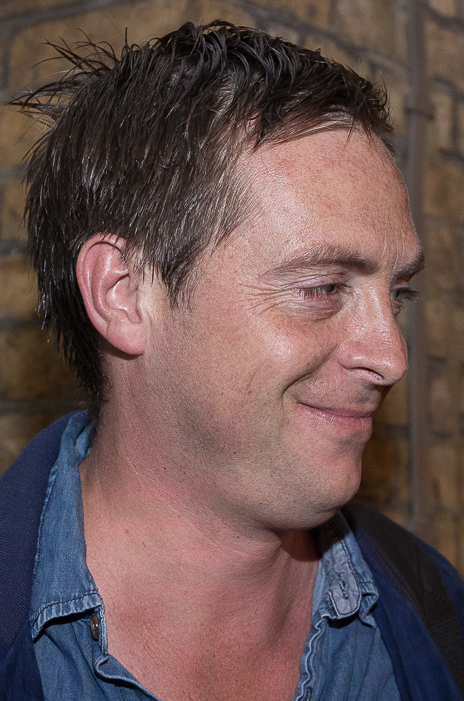
Stephen Campbell Moore starred as Maurice Wilkins

- Nicole Kidman as Rosalind Franklin
- Stephen Campbell Moore as Maurice Wilkins
- Edward Bennett as Francis Crick
- Will Attenborough as James Watson
- Patrick Kennedy as Donald Caspar
- Josh Silver as Raymond Gosling

== Critical response ==
Michael Billington of The Guardian wrote that "Nicole Kidman captures the ecstasy of scientific discovery".... "Anna Ziegler's new play asserts the contribution of 1950s chemist Rosalind Franklin to the discovery of DNA and asks: is science still sexist?."

Ben Brantley of The New York Times wrote that "When Nicole Kidman steps out of the shadows, breaking off from a wall of men, and onto the edge of the stage at the Noël Coward Theatre...her eyes beam undiluted willpower. It is a gaze that both chills and warms, radiating and demanding trust in this singularly self-possessed presence..... Yes, the script makes its concessions to romantic conventions.... Photograph 51 sustains crisp dramatic tension even when it skirts banality or expository tedium. And Ms Kidman, who turns Franklin's guardedness into as much a revelation as a concealment of character, is pretty close to perfection."

Paul Taylor of The Independent wrote that "In her compelling and subtle performance, Kidman beautifully captures the prickly defensiveness, the lonely dedication, and the suppressed emotional longings of the scientist.... Michael Grandage's superb 91-minute production expertly balances its energies as detective thriller and as interactive speculation about the hovering moments where her life could have taken a different turning."

Stephen Dalton of The Hollywood Reporter wrote that "...Ziegler's play is essentially a middling blend of straight bio-drama and high-school science lesson. Without Kidman's marquee appeal, it would have been an unusually dowdy choice for the West End. Fortunately, Kidman delivers." "[H]er performance is muted but reliably intense, hinting at wounded depths beneath Franklin's implacably chilly exterior....Grandage's production is a worthy effort, but a little passionless, inherently limited in dramatic force by its subject matter."

Dominic Cavendish of The Daily Telegraph gave the play four out of five stars, writing that "...Kidman brilliantly suggests an intelligent woman compacted of porcelain and steel. Being no-nonsense, she's often funny. An early put-down – 'I don't joke' – gets a laugh but lays bare her peculiarity too." and "Although the supporting male performances suffer from scantily written roles, Grandage directs it all with characteristically fluid aplomb, placing the action (sometimes using neat, quasi-scientific symmetries) amid a towering set by Christopher Oram that evokes the bombed-out Palladian magnificence of King's, piles of rubble lapping at arches. The effect is part bunker, part grand signifier of civilisation and the building blocks of life, and part tomb too. Neil Austin's forensic lighting, cutting through clouds of haze, sees to it that as Edward Bennett and Will Attenborough's Crick and Watson finally unravel a secret held from mankind for millennia, all hint of rosiness in Rosalind's face vanishes, a deathly pallor taking its stead. Can one image tell us almost everything? Yes, it can. A triumph."

Henry Hitchings of Evening Standard gave the play four out of five stars, writing that "This isn't an obvious star vehicle, and there's certainly plenty for those around Kidman to get their teeth into in Michael Grandage's smartly paced production. Edward Bennett and Will Attenborough combine vigorously as Francis Crick and James Watson, whose names are today synonymous with scientific sleuthing, and Stephen Campbell Moore brings just the right degree of donnish clumsiness to Maurice Wilkins, who shared their Nobel Prize in 1962 (four years after Franklin's untimely death). Only the American researcher Don Caspar (the excellent Patrick Kennedy) seems capable of treating her as a person rather than an obstacle. Still, it's Kidman's finely poised performance that underpins this vision of intensely entwined but separate lives. She captures the obsessive nature of a woman dismissed by Watson as being “sticky” and having an “acid smile”, while suggesting the complexity beneath her severe façade – an inspiring mix of passion, pride and vulnerability."

Ian Shuttleworth of FT wrote that "Kidman was last seen on the London stage in David Hare's The Blue Room in 1998. This time her kit remains on, and dowdy: Franklin has eyes only for her X-ray crystallography work on DNA at King's College, London, without which Crick and Watson over in Cambridge would almost certainly not have cracked the secret of the double helix. In Michael Grandage's production, Kidman manages to animate the cold fish Franklin; her features are fluidly though not hugely mobile."

Michael Arditti of Express gave it four stars, commenting that Rosalind Franklin refused to elicit sympathy from her colleagues, and it is to Kidman's credit that she refuses to elicit it from her audience. Like her character, she focuses on the intellectual, which makes her two moments of self-revelation all the more powerful.".

== Awards and nominations ==
Year	Award	Category	Nominee	Result
2015	Evening Standard Theatre Award	Best Actress	Nicole Kidman	Won
2015	Harper's Bazaar Women of the Year Award	Theatre Icon	Nicole Kidman	Won
2016	Laurence Olivier Award	Best Actress	Nicole Kidman	Nominated
2016	WhatsOnStage Award	Best New Play		Won
2016	WhatsOnStage Award	Best Actress in a Play	Nicole Kidman	Won
