= Lawrence Aronovitch =

Canadian playwright and actor

Lawrence Aronovitch is a Canadian playwright and actor based in Ottawa, Ontario. He is the playwright in residence at the Great Canadian Theatre Company. Aronovitch is a graduate of Harvard University, where he studied the history of science. As an undergraduate, he appeared on stage in a number of student productions.

His first play, Galatea, was produced by Toto Too Theatre in 2009. The play, which is a modern gay version of the classic Pygmalion story, has also been produced in Vancouver, British Columbia and has toured in Northern Ireland.

Aronovitch's next work, The Lavender Railroad, consists of two related one-act plays, each of which looks at the moral choices required of people living in a totalitarian world in which being gay or lesbian is a capital crime. It was produced by Evolution Theatre in 2011.

His ten-minute play Late was featured in New Theatre of Ottawa's Extremely Short Play Festival in May 2012. New Theatre of Ottawa also produced his ten-minute play The Book of Daniel for the 2013 Extremely Short Play Festival.

His play False Assumptions was produced at the Gladstone Theatre in Ottawa in March 2013, featuring graduating students from the Ottawa Theatre School. The play presents the life of Marie Curie and features a number of historical woman scientists as characters, including Hypatia of Alexandria, Ada Lovelace, and Rosalind Franklin.

His play The Auden Test was presented at Arts Court in Ottawa as part of Just Mingling: A Queer Theatrical Salon in March 2016. The play interweaves the lives of the poet W. H. Auden and the mathematician Alan Turing.

Aronovitch has acted on stage in Playing Bare (Evolution Theatre) and Family Matters (New Ottawa Repertory Theatre) and has appeared in the independent films I Never Told Anyone and Call of the City.

== Personal life ==
He is queer.
