= Rosalind Franklin and DNA =

1975 book by Anne Sayre

- First edition
- Author: Anne Sayre
- Language: English
- Subject: Rosalind Franklin
- Published: 1975
- Publisher: W. W. Norton & Company
- Publication place: United States
- Media type: Print
- Pages: 221
- ISBN: 978-0-393-32044-2
- OCLC: 806315258
- Dewey Decimal: 574.8/732/0924
- LC Class: Qp26.F68S29 1975

Rosalind Franklin and DNA is a biography of an English chemist Rosalind Franklin (1920–1958) written by her American friend Anne Sayre in 1975. Franklin was a physical chemist who made pivotal research in the discovery of the structure of DNA, known as "the most important discovery" in biology. DNA itself had become "life's most famous molecule". While working at the King's College London in 1951, she discovered two types of DNA called A-DNA and B-DNA. Her X-ray images of DNA indicated helical structure. Her X-ray image of B-DNA (called Photo 51) taken in 1952 became the best evidence for the structure of DNA. For the discovery of the correct chemical structure of DNA, the Nobel Prize in Physiology or Medicine 1962 was shared by her colleagues and close researchers James Watson, Francis Crick and Maurice Wilkins; she had died four years earlier in 1958 making her ineligible for the award.

== Background ==
Rosalind Franklin joined King's College London in January 1951 to work on the crystallography of DNA. By the end of that year, she established two important facts: one is that phosphate groups, which are the molecular backbone for the nucleotide chains, lie on the outside (it was a general consensus at the time that they were at the inside); and the other is that DNA exists in two forms, a crystalline (dry form) A-DNA and a hydrated (wet form) B-DNA. With her PhD student Raymond Gosling, she produced a series of X-ray images of DNA. The photograph (number 51, hence, popularised as Photo 51) of B-DNA taken in May 1952 was especially crucial. X-ray crystallography did not immediately show the precise helical structure. Franklin chose to work on A-DNA, while B-DNA was given to Maurice Wilkins. By the early 1953, Franklin was aware that both A and B forms of DNA were composed of two helical chains. By then, James Watson and Francis Crick at Cambridge University had built a correct double helical model of DNA, based on her experimental data.

The discovery of the structure of DNA in 1953 is regarded as "the greatest and most important scientific discovery of the 20th Century". Francis Crick, James Watson and Maurice Wilkins received the Nobel Prize in Physiology or Medicine in 1962 for the discovery. This discovery laid the foundation for modern biology, including medical and molecular research. The discoverers earned lasting worldwide fame. But the contribution made by Rosalind Franklin, who died in 1958, was largely forgotten. The main motive for Sayre's book came from James Watson's memoir The Double Helix : A Personal Account of the Discovery of the Structure of DNA. Published in 1968, The Double Helix reflected the account of the discovery in which Franklin was portrayed as "uninteresting", "belligerent", and "sharp, stubborn mind", referring her as "Rosy", the name she did not want to be called. Watson described her as having "all the imagination of English blue-stocking adolescents", and "the product of an unsatisfied mother".

As a close friend of Franklin, Sayre realised that Watson's portrayal of Franklin was negative and referred to it as an "every known prejudice against intellectual women". She set a project for writing about Franklin's life and contribution to science. After researching for five years, she published the book in 1975, which she claimed was not a biography, but a protest to Watson's account. It is these two books which brought Franklin to fame.

Sayre first met Franklin in 1949 at Laboratoire Central des Services Chimiques de l'État in Paris, where Franklin and Sayre's husband were post-doctoral researchers. They frequently met in England after Franklin moved there. In the US also, Franklin visited her several times upon attending scientific conferences. They regularly exchanged letters. Sayre was particularly important during the last days of Franklin. Franklin developed ovarian cancer in 1957 and underwent surgical operation in London. Sayre stayed with Franklin at the hospital and looked after Franklin's apartment. After Franklin's discharge from hospital, she nursed her in a rented cottage for some days. Back in New York in October, Sayre received a letter from Franklin stating that Franklin was to visit her on the way to a conference at Bloomington, Indiana. They never met—Franklin's condition deteriorated and she died on 16 April 1958.

== Criticism ==
Sayre's book gave Franklin an important place in the history of science, as a major contributor to the discovery of the structure of DNA. However, the book is written from a strong feminist standpoint, portraying Franklin as an icon of the movement, and allegedly misrepresenting the nature of sexism at the time.

Sayre claimed that "in 1951 ... King's College as an institution, was not distinguished for the welcome that it offered to women ... Rosalind ... was unused to purdah [a religious and social institution of female seclusion] ... there was one other woman scientist on the laboratory staff". However, Farooq Hussain has noted that "there were seven women in the biophysics department ... Jean Hanson became an FRS, Dame Honor B. Fell, Director of Strangeways Laboratory, supervised the biologists". Another Franklin biographer, Brenda Maddox, agrees, declaring: "Randall ... did have many women on his staff ... they found him ... sympathetic and helpful."

Sayre also said that "while the male staff at King's lunched in a large, comfortable, rather clubby dining room" the female staff of all ranks "lunched in the student's hall or away from the premises". However, Lynne Osman Elkin has asserted that most of the MRC group (including Franklin) typically ate lunch together in the mixed dining room discussed below. Maddox has concurred, asserting that Randall "liked to see his flock, men and women, come together for morning coffee, and at lunch in the joint dining room, where he ate with them nearly every day." Francis Crick also remarked that "her colleagues treated men and women scientists alike."

Sayre also claimed that Franklin's father, Ellis, objected to his daughter's higher education. That has led to accusations of sexism in Ellis Franklin's attitude to Rosalind, as well as the allegation that he strongly opposed her entering Newnham College. Her sister, Jenifer Glynn, has maintained that those stories are myths, and that her parents fully supported Franklin's entire career.

Glynn has accused Sayre of making her sister a feminist heroine, and called Rosalind Franklin and DNA "the start of what has become something of a 'Rosalind Industry'." She has argued that declaring Franklin to be a feminist symbol would have "embarrassed her [Rosalind Franklin] almost as much as Watson's account would have upset her", and maintains that her sister "was never a feminist." Crick, and Franklin's close friend Aaron Klug, have agreed that Franklin was definitely not a feminist.

== See also ==
- Rosalind Franklin: The Dark Lady of DNA
