= Mehring (disambiguation) =

Mehring is a municipality in Bavaria.

Mehring may also refer to:

== People ==
- Franz Mehring (1846–1919), German politician
- Howard Mehring (1931–1978), American painter
- Sona Mehring (1961–), American entrepreneur
- Walter Mehring (1896–1981), German author

== Places ==
- Mehring, Rhineland-Palatinate, a municipality in Rhineland-Palatinate

== See also ==
- Mering (disambiguation)
