= John Thomas Finch =

British X-ray crystallographer and electron microscopist (1930–2017)

John Finch FRS (28 February 1930 – 5 December 2017) was a British X-ray crystallographer and electron microscopist. After working and receiving a PhD at Birkbeck College London, where he was hired by Rosalind Franklin, he worked at the Laboratory of Molecular Biology in Cambridge from 1962 on biological structures and macromolecules, including of nucleosomes and of viruses such as tobacco mosaic virus.
