= Jacques Mering =

Lithuanian-French engineer (1904–1973)

- Born: 3 January 1904; Vilkaviškis, Lithuania
- Died: 29 March 1973 (aged 69); Paris, France
- Citizenship: Russian; Naturalised French (1930)
- Education: Faculté des sciences de Paris
- Scientific career
- Fields: Clay mineralogy X-ray diffraction
- Workplaces: Faculté des sciences de Paris; Centre National de Recherche Scientifique
- Notable students: Rosalind Franklin

Jacques Mering (3 January 1904–29 March 1973) was a Lithuanian-born, naturalised French engineer, well known in the fields of clay mineralogy and clay science, in graphite studies, and in the applications of X-ray diffraction and electron-optical methods to these.

Mering earned a Diplôme d'Ingénieur en Génie Electrique (Engineering Degree in Electrical Engineering) from École Spéciale des Travaux Publics in Paris in 1925, and Licencié de Sciences (BSc) from Faculté des sciences in Paris in 1928. He rose to become director of research at the Centre National de Recherche Scientifique (CNRS; France's National Centre for Scientific Research) in Paris; subsequently, in 1969, Mering founded and, until his death, directed the CNRS Centre de Recherche sur les Solides à Organisation Cristalline Imparfaite (Research Center on Solids with Imperfect Crystalline Organization), in Orléans, France. Mering is also remembered for his formative influence on the British physical chemist Rosalind Franklin, whom he trained in X-ray crystallography in Paris, and who, until her untimely death, produced DNA crystallographic data of exquisite quality.

== Early life and education ==
Jacques Mering was born on 3 January 1904 to a Lithuanian Jewish ("Litvak") family in Vilkaviškis, Lithuania, then within the Russian Empire. After completing education up to secondary school in Russia, he went to France in 1921 to study engineering. In 1925 he obtained the degree of Diplôme d'Ingénieur en Génie Electrique (Engineering Degree in Electrical Engineering) from École Spéciale des Travaux Publics in Paris, and in 1928 a Licence de Sciences (equivalent to bachelor in science degree) from Faculté des sciences in Paris.

== Career ==
He joined the Faculté des sciences in Paris as research engineer in 1925, remaining in that position while he was pursued his Licence de Sciences. In the late 1920s he trained for X-ray crystallography under Marcel Mathieu (who had trained under the Nobel laureate William Henry Bragg at the Royal Institution in London). Mering was naturalised as a French citizen in 1930, and continued to work as a Faculté des sciences research engineer until 1931.

After conscripted service in the French Army (1931-1932), Mering joined Laboratoire Central des Services Chimique de l'Etat (now Institut National de Recherche Chimique Appliquée), first in Montpellier, then Grenoble (now under Joseph Fourier University), and finally in Paris. At Grenoble he carried out his research as a refugee during World War II, and he set up the first X-ray laboratory there. He returned to Paris after the war in 1945. In 1959 he became director of research at the Centre National de Recherche Scientifique (CNRS), and in 1969, director of the CNRS Centre de Recherche sur les Solides à Organization Cristalline Imparfaite (Research Center on Solids with Imperfect Crystalline Organization) in Orléans, France (where he was succeeded after his death by Jose J. Fripia).

=== Scientific contributions ===
Mering published over 100 technical papers on X-ray and electron diffraction of clays and related layer silicates, and of carbon, graphite, and the phenomena involved in graphitisation. He also performed numerous experimental works on fine-grained materials, including crystal growth in gels, the crystalline organization in cellulose, the 'decoration' of kaolinite crystals with colloidal gold particles, clays as catalysts, montmorillonites, hectorite, and clay-organic complexes.

== Awards and recognitions ==
Mering was a founding member and then President (1956–1958) of Groupe Français des Argiles. He was also president of the Groupe Français d'Etude des Carbones, and of the Association Française de Cristallographie. At the time of his death, he was Vice-Président of the Société Française de Minéralogie et Cristallographie, and he was an elected member of The Clay Minerals Society in the U.S. A technical work entitled X-Ray Diffraction by Disordered Lamellar Structures (1990), by former students and collaborators, was in stated tribute to his life's work in related areas.

== Personal life ==
Mering was known to be a strictly principled individual when it came to academic ethics. He never demanded co-authorship in publications of theses of his own students, despite it being a tradition in France at the time. Moreover, he never published with more than three co-authors, one of them would be an external collaborator if there were three, this despite his laboratory being at capacity in terms of numbers of researchers. His work ethic was noted to be demanding, but during breaks he allowed great liberty—in addition to discussing their scientific work, researchers were encouraged to develop friendships, share coffee and meals, go for outings, and to discuss politics and social issues.

In his private life, Mering had his own frivolities. Separated but not divorced from his wife, he charmed other women and had a mistress. He was described by a Rosalind Franklin biographer as deliberate in these behaviors, and so a man "with whom all the young women were in love"; he was also one, per this biographer, with whom Franklin herself felt mutual attraction, and one who would eventually destroy all of their correspondence.

Mering died on 29 March 1973 (in his 70th year), after several months of illness, in Paris.
