= Nancy Kawalek =

Nancy Kawalek is a professor at the University of Chicago, and is the director of STAGE which resides within the Pritzker School of Molecular Engineering. STAGE is a laboratory focused on producing art, mostly theater, that emphasizes the intersection between art and science.

== Early life and education ==
Nancy Kawalek grew up in New York City. She graduated from Northwestern University with a bachelor's degree in theater and oral interpretation and began her career as a professional actor, mainly in New York. Beside theater, she spent some of her time in movies, TV shows, and commercials.

Kawalek was then asked to teach at the University of California, Santa Barbara eventually became a studio professor in the film and media studies department and the media arts and technology program. It was here at the University of California Santa Barbara that Kawalek started STAGE (Scientists, Technologists and Artists Generating Exploration) as an international script competition that was looking to award the best new play about science and technology. Since 2013, Kawalek has been working as a professor and distinguished fellow in the arts, science, and technology at the University of Chicago.

== STAGE ==
Beginning as a script competition in 2005, STAGE has become a laboratory dedicated to creating theater and other artistic outlets inspired by science and technology. At its conception, STAGE was judged by winners of awards such as the Nobel Prize, Pulitzer Prize, and Tony Award which garnered the program a lot of exposure.

Now, STAGE is a laboratory located in the Institute for Molecular Engineering at the University of Chicago. The plays portray the stories of different scientific fields from their inception to real-life application. They are written with a collaborative effort from artists and scientists, and star both student and professional actors. Though the productions incorporate lots of technology, Kawalek is searching for emotional engagement and prefers them to be content driven. She intersects art and science in the initial creation of the productions, using improvisation as a means of experimentation.

The productions don't start with a script, but are developed through this collaborative improvisation which acts as research. Kawalek aims for the stories to be informative about science and technology, but be human in nature rather than seeming like a formal lecture. In order to keep the scientific aspect, technology is included in the staging of the plays to enhance storytelling rather than being the star of the show.

Kawalek was initially inspired by her own scientist friends, and specifically the idea of how failure is welcome in the scientific world whereas it is shunned in the artistic world. She saw the presence of science everywhere, but noticed it was not widely trusted, and uses STAGE to present this idea in a palatable way and steer the audience toward appreciating science.
