= Donald Caspar =

American structural biologist (1927–2021)

Donald L. D. Caspar
- Born: January 8, 1927
- Died: November 27, 2021 (aged 94); Tallahassee, Florida
- Other name: Don Caspar
- Citizenship: American
- Education: Cornell University (BA); Yale University (PhD)
- Awards: Fellow of the Biophysical Society Award
- Scientific career
- Fields: Structural biology
- Workplaces: California Institute of Technology; Florida State University; Brandeis University; Birkbeck, University of London; King's College London
- Thesis: The Radial Structure of Tobacco Mosaic Virus (1955)
- Doctoral advisor: Ernest C. Pollard
- Other academic advisors: Max Delbrück; Rosalind Franklin
- Doctoral students: Stephen C. Harrison
- Other notable students: Kenneth Holmes (postdoctoral researcher)
- Website: Florida State University page

Donald L. D. Caspar (January 8, 1927 – November 27, 2021) was an American structural biologist (the very term he coined) known for his works on the structures of biological molecules, particularly of the tobacco mosaic virus. He was an emeritus professor of biological science at the Institute of Molecular Biophysics, Florida State University, and an emeritus professor of biology at the Rosenstiel Basic Medical Sciences Research Center, Brandeis University. He has made significant scientific contributions in virus biology, X-ray, neutron and electron diffraction, and protein plasticity.

Caspar completed his BA in physics from Cornell University in 1950. He joined Yale University from where he earned his PhD in biophysics in 1955. He was supervised by Ernest C. Pollard. His thesis was on the structure of tobacco mosaic virus (TMV) titled The Radial Structure of Tobacco Mosaic Virus. While waiting for his degree he worked under Max Delbrück at the California Institute of Technology as post doctoral student. He worked with James D. Watson, with whom he had close professional association throughout his career. After receiving his PhD, he went to England having been awarded a fellowship at King's College London under Rosalind Franklin and during 1955–1956 worked with her at Birkbeck College in London. Their meeting was fruitful both personally and professionally. He remained one of Franklin's closest friends during her brief lifetime. In 1956 he and Franklin published individual but complementary papers in the March 10 issue of Nature, together showing that TMV was a hollow rod, rather than a solid structure as generally believed. They also demonstrated that RNA in TMV was wound along the inner surface of the hollow virus. He was not a particularly enthusiastic writer; as a result, Franklin had to write every word of his paper.

At Birkbeck one of his colleagues was Aaron Klug with whom he developed research collaborations throughout his career. In 1962, they introduced the concept of quasi-equivalence to account for the arrangement of proteins on the surface of icosahedral virus particles. Caspar-Klug theory has played an important part in shaping the subsequent study of viruses and other macromolecular assemblies. The original concept was based mainly on electron microscope studies, and has now been refined to take account of the atomic resolution structure of viruses, and other details of protein–protein interactions that crystallography has elucidated. Quasi-equivalence continues to be an important component of the philosophical basis for how we think about macromolecular assemblies.

In 1994 Caspar received the Guggenheim Fellowships. He was a Fellow of the American Academy of Arts & Sciences. He was elected a member of the Biophysics and Computational Biology section of the National Academy of Sciences in 1994. He received the first Fellow of the Biophysical Society Award in 2000.
