= Anna Ziegler (playwright) =

American playwright

- Born: 1979 (age 46–47); Brooklyn, New York, United States
- Education: Yale University; University of East Anglia; New York University
- Occupations: Poet, playwright

Anna Ziegler is an American playwright.

She was educated at Saint Ann's School, studied English at Yale University, earned an MA in poetry from the University of East Anglia in 2002, and graduated with an MFA in dramatic writing from New York University in 2004.

In 2015, Ziegler's play Photograph 51, about the part played by Rosalind Franklin in the discovery of the structure of DNA, was staged in London's West End, with Nicole Kidman in the role of Franklin. Kidman won The Evening Standard Award for Best Actress for her performance.

In The New York Times, in 2015, Ziegler was described as "newly (and justly) hot" and her writing as "lyrical...[with] a luminous beauty."

== Plays ==
- BFF (2007)
- Life Science (2007)
- Photograph 51 (2008) – winner 2016 WhatsOnStage Award for Best New Play
- Dov and Ali (2008) – productions at The Playwrights Realm in New York, 2009 and Theatre 503 in London, 2008
- Another Way Home (2011)
- Boy (2015)—nominee for 2016 Outer Critics Circle John Gassner award
- A Delicate Ship (2015) – premiere at The Playwrights Realm
- The Last Match (2015) – production at Roundabout Theatre Company, Fall 2017
- Actually (2017) – co world-premiere productions at the Geffen Playhouse, Williamstown Theatre Festival and Manhattan Theatre Club, 2017
- The Minotaur (2018)
- The Great Moment (2019) – premiere at Seattle Repertory Theatre
- The Wanderers (2020)
- Evening All Afternoon (2026) - Premiere at the Donmar Warehouse
- Antigone (This Play I Read In High School) (2026) – premiere at The Public Theater
