= Molecular Structure of Nucleic Acids: A Structure for Deoxyribose Nucleic Acid =

1953 scientific paper on DNA

"Molecular Structure of Nucleic Acids: A Structure for Deoxyribose Nucleic Acid" was the first article published to describe the discovery of the double helix structure of DNA, using X-ray diffraction and the mathematics of a helix transform. It was published by Francis Crick and James D. Watson in the scientific journal Nature on pages 737–738 of its 171st volume (dated 25 April 1953).

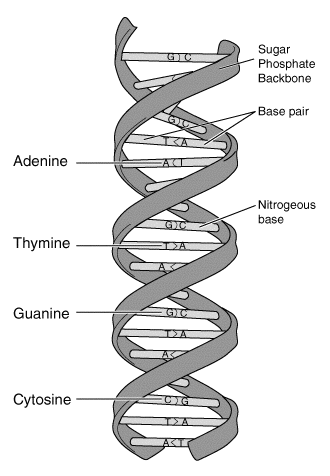
Diagramatic representation of the key structural features of the DNA double helix. This figure does not depict B-DNA.

This article is often termed a "pearl" of science because it is brief and contains the answer to a fundamental mystery about living organisms. This mystery was the question of how it is possible that genetic instructions are held inside organisms and how they are passed from generation to generation. The article presents a simple and elegant solution, which surprised many biologists at the time who believed that DNA transmission was going to be more difficult to deduce and understand. The discovery had a major impact on biology, particularly in the field of genetics, enabling later researchers to understand the genetic code.

== Evolution of molecular biology ==
The application of physics and chemistry to biological problems led to the development of molecular biology, which is particularly concerned with the flow and consequences of biological information from DNA to proteins. The discovery of the DNA double helix made clear that genes are functionally defined parts of DNA molecules, and that there must be a way for cells to translate the information in DNA to specific amino acids, which make proteins.

Linus Pauling was a chemist who was very influential in developing an understanding of the structure of biological molecules. In 1951, Pauling published the structure of the alpha helix, a fundamentally important structural component of proteins. In early 1953, Pauling published a triple helix model of DNA, which subsequently turned out to be incorrect. Both Crick, and particularly Watson, thought that they were racing against Pauling to discover the structure of DNA.

Max Delbrück was a physicist who recognized some of the biological implications of quantum physics. Delbruck's thinking about the physical basis of life stimulated Erwin Schrödinger to write What Is Life?. Schrödinger's book was an important influence on Crick and Watson. Delbruck's efforts to promote the "Phage Group" (exploring genetics by way of the viruses that infect bacteria) was important in the early development of molecular biology in general and the development of Watson's scientific interests in particular.

Crick, Watson, and Maurice Wilkins won the 1962 Nobel Prize for Medicine in recognition of their discovery of the DNA double helix structure.

== DNA structure and function ==
It is not always the case that the structure of a molecule is easy to relate to its function. What makes the structure of DNA so obviously related to its function was described modestly at the end of the article: "It has not escaped our notice that the specific pairing we have postulated immediately suggests a possible copying mechanism for the genetic material".

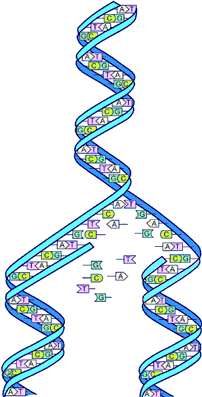
DNA replication. The two base-pair complementary chains of the DNA molecule allow replication of the genetic instructions.

The "specific pairing" is a key feature of the Watson and Crick model of DNA, the pairing of nucleotide subunits. In DNA, the amount of guanine is equal to cytosine and the amount of adenine is equal to thymine. The A:T and C:G pairs are structurally similar. In particular, the length of each base pair is the same and they fit equally between the two sugar-phosphate backbones. The base pairs are held together by hydrogen bonds, a type of chemical attraction that is easy to break and easy to reform. After realizing the structural similarity of the A:T and C:G pairs, Watson and Crick soon produced their double helix model of DNA with the hydrogen bonds at the core of the helix providing a way to unzip the two complementary strands for easy replication: the last key requirement for a likely model of the genetic molecule.

Indeed, the base-pairing did suggest a way to copy a DNA molecule: just pull apart the two sugar-phosphate backbones, each with its hydrogen bonded A, T, G, and C components. Each strand could then be used as a template for assembly of a new base-pair complementary strand.

=== Future considerations ===
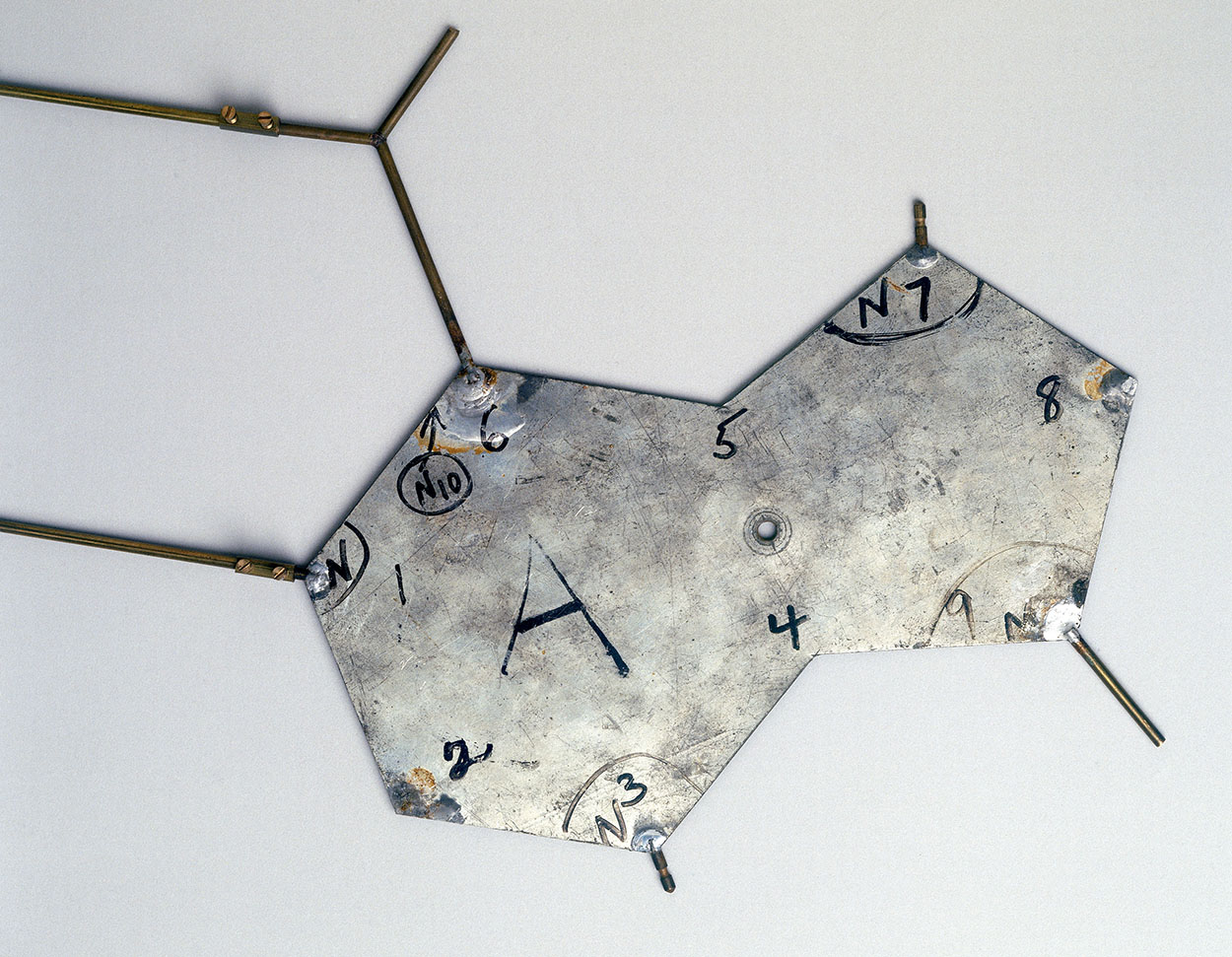
Watson and Crick used many aluminium templates like this one, which is the single base Adenine (A), to build a physical model of DNA in 1953.

When Watson and Crick produced their double helix model of DNA, it was known that most of the specialized features of the many different life forms on Earth are made possible by proteins. Structurally, proteins are long chains of amino acid subunits. In some way, the genetic molecule, DNA, had to contain instructions for how to make the thousands of proteins found in cells. From the DNA double helix model, it was clear that there must be some correspondence between the linear sequences of nucleotides in DNA molecules to the linear sequences of amino acids in proteins. The details of how sequences of DNA instruct cells to make specific proteins was worked out by molecular biologists during the period from 1953 to 1965. Francis Crick played an integral role in both the theory and analysis of the experiments that led to an improved understanding of the genetic code.

=== Consequences ===
Other advances in molecular biology stemming from the discovery of the DNA double helix eventually led to ways to sequence genes. James Watson directed the Human Genome Project at the National Institutes of Health. The ability to sequence and manipulate DNA is now central to the biotechnology industry and modern medicine. The austere beauty of the structure and the practical implications of the DNA double helix combined to make Molecular structure of Nucleic Acids; A Structure for Deoxyribose Nucleic Acid one of the most prominent biology articles of the twentieth century.

== Collaborators and controversy ==
Although Watson and Crick were first to put together all the scattered fragments of information that were required to produce a successful molecular model of DNA, their findings had been based on data collected by researchers in several other laboratories. For example, they drew on published research relating to the discovery of Hydrogen bonds in DNA by John Masson Gulland, Denis Jordan and their colleagues at University College Nottingham in 1947. However the discovery of the DNA double helix also used a considerable amount of material from the unpublished work of Rosalind Franklin, A.R. Stokes, Maurice Wilkins, and H.R. Wilson at King's College London. Key data from Wilkins, Stokes, and Wilson, and, separately, by Franklin and Gosling, were published in two separate additional articles in the same issue of Nature with the article by Watson and Crick. The article by Watson and Crick acknowledged that they had been "stimulated" by experimental results from the King's College researchers, and a similar acknowledgment was published by Wilkins, Stokes, and Wilson in the following three-page article.

In 1968, Watson published a highly controversial autobiographical account of the discovery of the double-helical, molecular structure of DNA called The Double Helix, which was not publicly accepted either by Crick or Wilkins. Furthermore, Erwin Chargaff also printed a rather "unsympathetic review" of Watson's book in the 29 March 1968 issue of Science. In the book, Watson stated among other things that he and Crick had access to some of Franklin's data from a source that she was not aware of, and also that he had seen—without her permission—the B-DNA X-ray diffraction pattern obtained by Franklin and Gosling in May 1952 at King's in London. In particular, in late 1952, Franklin had submitted a progress report to the Medical Research Council, which was reviewed by Max Perutz, then at the Cavendish Laboratory of the University of Cambridge. Watson and Crick also worked in the MRC-supported Cavendish Laboratory in Cambridge whereas Wilkins and Franklin were in the MRC-supported laboratory at King's in London. Such MRC reports were not usually widely circulated, but Crick read a copy of Franklin's research summary in early 1953.

Perutz's justification for passing Franklin's report about the crystallographic unit of the B-DNA and A-DNA structures to both Crick and Watson was that the report contained information which Watson had heard before, in November 1951, when Franklin talked about her unpublished results with Raymond Gosling during a meeting arranged by M.H.F. Wilkins at King's College, following a request from Crick and Watson; Perutz said he had not acted unethically because the report had been part of an effort to promote wider contact between different MRC research groups and was not confidential. This justification would exclude Crick, who was not present at the November 1951 meeting, yet Perutz also gave him access to Franklin's MRC report data. Crick and Watson then sought permission from Cavendish Laboratory head William Lawrence Bragg, to publish their double-helix molecular model of DNA based on data from Franklin and Wilkins.

By November 1951, Watson had acquired little training in X-ray crystallography, by his own admission, and thus had not fully understood what Franklin was saying about the structural symmetry of the DNA molecule. Crick, however, knowing the Fourier transforms of Bessel functions that represent the X-ray diffraction patterns of helical structures of atoms, correctly interpreted further one of Franklin's experimental findings as indicating that DNA was most likely to be a double helix with the two polynucleotide chains running in opposite directions. Crick was thus in a unique position to make this interpretation because he had formerly worked on the X-ray diffraction data for other large molecules that had helical symmetry similar to that of DNA. Franklin, on the other hand, rejected the first molecular model building approach proposed by Crick and Watson: the first DNA model, which in 1952 Watson presented to her and to Wilkins in London, had an obviously incorrect structure with hydrated charged groups on the inside of the model, rather than on the outside. Watson explicitly admitted this in his book The Double Helix.

== See also ==
- Comparison of nucleic acid simulation software: nucleic acid modeling
- Crystallography
- Miles from Tomorrowland, a TV series (2015–2018) with twin admirals named Watson and Crick
- Paracrystallinity
- X-ray scattering
- Keto-enol tautomerism#DNA, the final key insight, from a Pauling collaborator, that the textbooks of the time were wrong, that led to the solved structure
- Avery-MacLeod-McCarty experiment, the first demonstration that DNA was likely to be the genetic material
- Chargaff's rules, which showed that A:T and G:C occurred in equal amounts

== Bibliography ==
- Judson, Horace Freeland (1979). The Eighth Day of Creation. Makers of the Revolution in Biology. Simon and Schuster. ISBN 978-0-671-22540-7.
- Maddox, Brenda (2002). Rosalind Franklin: The Dark Lady of DNA. Harper Collins. ISBN 978-0-060-98508-0.
- Olby, Robert (1974). The Path to The Double Helix: Discovery of DNA. MacMillan. ISBN 978-0-486-68117-7. (with foreword by Francis Crick; revised in 1994, with a 9-page postscript.)
- Watson, James D. (1980). The Double Helix: A Personal Account of the Discovery of the Structure of DNA. Atheneum. ISBN 978-0-689-70602-8. (first published in 1968)
- Wilkins, Maurice (2003). The Third Man of the Double Helix: The Autobiography of Maurice Wilkins. Oxford University Press. ISBN 978-0-198-60665-9.
- Life Story (TV film) a BBC dramatization about the scientific race to discover the DNA double-helix.
