= Rudolf Signer =

Swiss organic chemist (1903–1990)

- Born: 17 March 1903; Herisau, Switzerland
- Died: 1 December 1990 (aged 87); Gümlingen, Switzerland
- Education: ETH Zurich, University of Fribourg
- Awards: Lavoisier Medal
- Scientific career
- Fields: Organic chemistry
- Workplaces: University of Bern

Rudolf Signer (17 March 1903, Herisau, Switzerland – 1 December 1990, Gümlingen, Switzerland) contributed to the discovery of the DNA double helix. He was a Professor for organic chemistry at the University of Bern from 1935 until 1972.

== Education ==
Signer was the son of Jakob Signer, a chemical scientist working in the textile industry, and his wife Dorothea Agnes Scherrer. Rudolf Signer went to high school in St. Gallen and matriculated at the ETH Zurich in 1921 to study chemistry, initially in order to become a teacher. In 1927, he graduated with his doctorate under the supervision of Hermann Staudinger. Already in 1926, he had become Wissenschaftlicher Assistent at the University of Fribourg, where he qualified as a professor with a Habilitation.

== Career ==
Signer spent 1932–1933 in Uppsala and Manchester on a Rockefeller-scholarship. He became a non-tenured professor for general and inorganic chemistry at the University of Bern in 1935 and was tenured in 1939. He went on to become director of the university's Institute of Chemistry and retired as emeritus in 1972.

== Research ==
Signer focused on macromolecular chemistry, in particular with regards to natural products. In 1938 he measured and described the properties of DNA, discovering its thread-like structure. In 1950 Signer produced extraordinarily pure DNA from the thymus of calves, of which he took 15 grams of extraordinarily pure DNA to London. In England he gave it to various scientists, among them Maurice Wilkins, in order to promote research in the field. The analysis of X-ray images of these DNA samples, especially Photo 51 by Raymond Gosling and Rosalind Franklin, allowed James Watson and Francis Crick to discover the double-helix structure of DNA. The remainder of the DNA which Signer brought to England survive today in the collection of King's College, London. Over 250 of Signer's scientific writings were published during his lifetime. The Lavoisier Medal was awarded to him for his scientific work and achievements.
