= Florence Bell (scientist) =

British X-ray crystallographer

Florence Ogilvy Bell
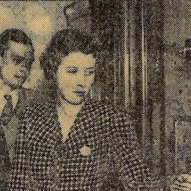
- in the Yorkshire Evening News in 23 March 1939
- Born: 1 May 1913; London, England
- Died: 23 November 2000
- Education: University of Leeds; University of Cambridge
- Scientific career
- Workplaces: University of Leeds; University of Manchester
- Thesis: X-ray and related studies of the structure of the proteins and nucleic acids
- Doctoral advisor: William Astbury

Florence Ogilvy Bell (1 May 1913 – 23 November 2000), later Florence Sawyer, was a British scientist who contributed to the discovery of the structure of DNA. She was an X-ray crystallographer in the lab of William Astbury. In 1938 they published a paper in Nature that described the structure of DNA as a "Pile of Pennies".

== Early life ==
Florence Ogilvy Bell was born at 47 Hanover Road, Brondesbury Park, London, the second daughter of Thomas Bell and his wife, Annie Mary Lucas. Her father was a photographer and later advertising manager who had been born in Allendale, Northumberland, and later he moved to Greycotes, Ambleside. Florence grew up in London and attended Haberdashers' Aske Girls School in Acton, where she was head girl.

== Education ==
Bell studied Natural Sciences at Girton College, Cambridge between 1932 and 1935, concentrating on chemistry, physics and mineralogy. Whilst a student at Cambridge, she was taught how to use x-ray crystallography to study biological molecules by John Desmond Bernal. She moved to the University of Manchester, where she worked with Lawrence Bragg on protein crystallography.

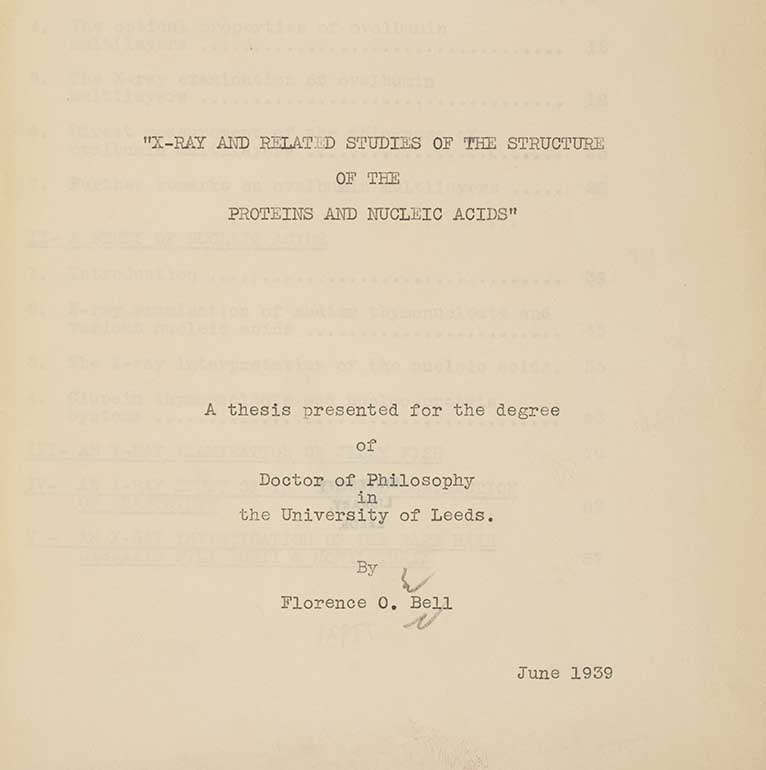
Cover page of Florence Bell's 1939 thesis

In 1937, William Astbury wrote to Lawrence Bragg looking for a good crystallographer, and he recommended Bell as an "excellent candidate". In 1937 Bell arrived at the University of Leeds, where she joined Astbury's laboratory. During her graduate studies she used X-ray diffraction to characterise biomolecules, including nucleic acids. Her initial work was on the structure of protein multilayers, but after Leeds received samples of highly purified DNA, Astbury directed her to study DNA as the second part of her Ph.D. thesis. She received her Ph.D. in 1939. Her notebook and thesis are held at the University of Leeds Special Collections

== Career ==
Astbury's original appointment at the University of Leeds was to study textile physics, where he identified a change in keratin inside wool fibres from alpha to beta form on stretching. In 1939 Bell gave a talk about textiles during an Institute of Physics conference at the University of Leeds, which was covered in the Yorkshire Evening Post in an article entitled "Women Scientist Explains". In the article Bell was described as a "slim University of Cambridge graduate".

=== DNA crystallography ===
In 1937, Astbury became interested in DNA and directed Bell to work on the molecule. Bell came up with a method to stretch out the fibers to make dried films of purified DNA, with which she took x-ray diffraction photographs that were clearer than previous work. Her work confirmed it was a regular, ordered structure with periodicity of 3.3 – 3.4 Å along the axis. She studied the nucleic acids in yeast, pancreases, tobacco mosaic virus and calf thymus. She recognised that the "beginnings of life are clearly associated with the interaction of proteins and nucleic acids". Bell and Astbury published an X-ray study on DNA in 1938, describing the nucleotides as a "Pile of Pennies". Astbury presented their work at the Cold Spring Harbor Laboratory. At the time, they were unaware that DNA can change conformation from A to B-form with humidity, and as a result their photographs are more blurry than the later Photo 51 x-ray image taken by Gosling in 1952.

Astbury and Bell's recent developments on x-ray studies of proteins were included in the conference proceedings, "X-ray and the Stoichiochemistry of Proteins", "An X-ray Study of Thymonucleic Acid" and "Optical and X-ray Examination and Direct Measurement of Built-up Protein Multilayers". Astbury greatly admired Bell's willingness to challenge his ideas, referring to her as his "vox diabolica" (Devil's Advocate).

=== World war II and after ===
In 1941 Bell was enlisted to the Women's Auxiliary Air Force. The University of Leeds and William Astbury fought to get her back to the laboratory, keeping her position on hold and writing to the War Office. But Bell had fallen in love with an American serviceman, Capt. James Herbert Sawyer, and wrote to the university to say she was going to get married and move to the States.

Bell and Sawyer were married 21 December 1942 at St. Mary's Church in Ambleside. She then moved with her husband to the United States where she was employed by the British Air Commission in Washington, D.C., and later she worked as an industrial chemist for the Magnolia Petroleum Company in Beaumont, Texas. She died in Hereford in 2000.

== Legacy ==
The importance of Bell's work on DNA is that, although today we know that several features of her proposed model are incorrect, it nevertheless showed that DNA had a regular, ordered structure that could be studied using X-ray crystallography and so laid the foundations for later work by Maurice Wilkins, Rosalind Franklin and Raymond Gosling, as well as providing James Watson and Francis Crick with a key measurement – the distance between adjacent bases – when they began their own attempt to build a model of DNA. It is also worth noting that this work was done at a time when most scientists believed that proteins were the genetic material and that DNA was just a structural component composed of a monotonous repeat of bases.

Bell's notebook is held in the University of Leeds archives. She is included in the Oxford Dictionary of National Biography.

A seminar room was named in Bell's honor in the recently opened Sir William Henry Bragg Building on the campus of University of Leeds in 2022.

Bell's name is one of those featured on the sculpture Ribbons, unveiled in 2024.
