= Obsolete models of DNA structure =

In addition to the variety of verified DNA structures, there have been a range of proposed DNA models that have either been disproven, or lack sufficient evidence.

Some of these structures were proposed during the 1950s before the structure of the double helix was solved, most famously by Linus Pauling. Non-helical or "side-by-side" models of DNA were proposed in the 1970s to address what appeared at the time to be problems with the topology of circular DNA chromosomes during replication (subsequently resolved via the discovery of enzymes that modify DNA topology). These were also rejected due to accumulating experimental evidence from X-ray crystallography, solution NMR, and atomic force microscopy (of both DNA alone, and bound to DNA-binding proteins). Although localised or transient non-duplex helical structures exist, non-helical models are not currently accepted by the mainstream scientific community. Finally, there exists a persistent set of contemporary fringe theories proposing a range of unsupported models.

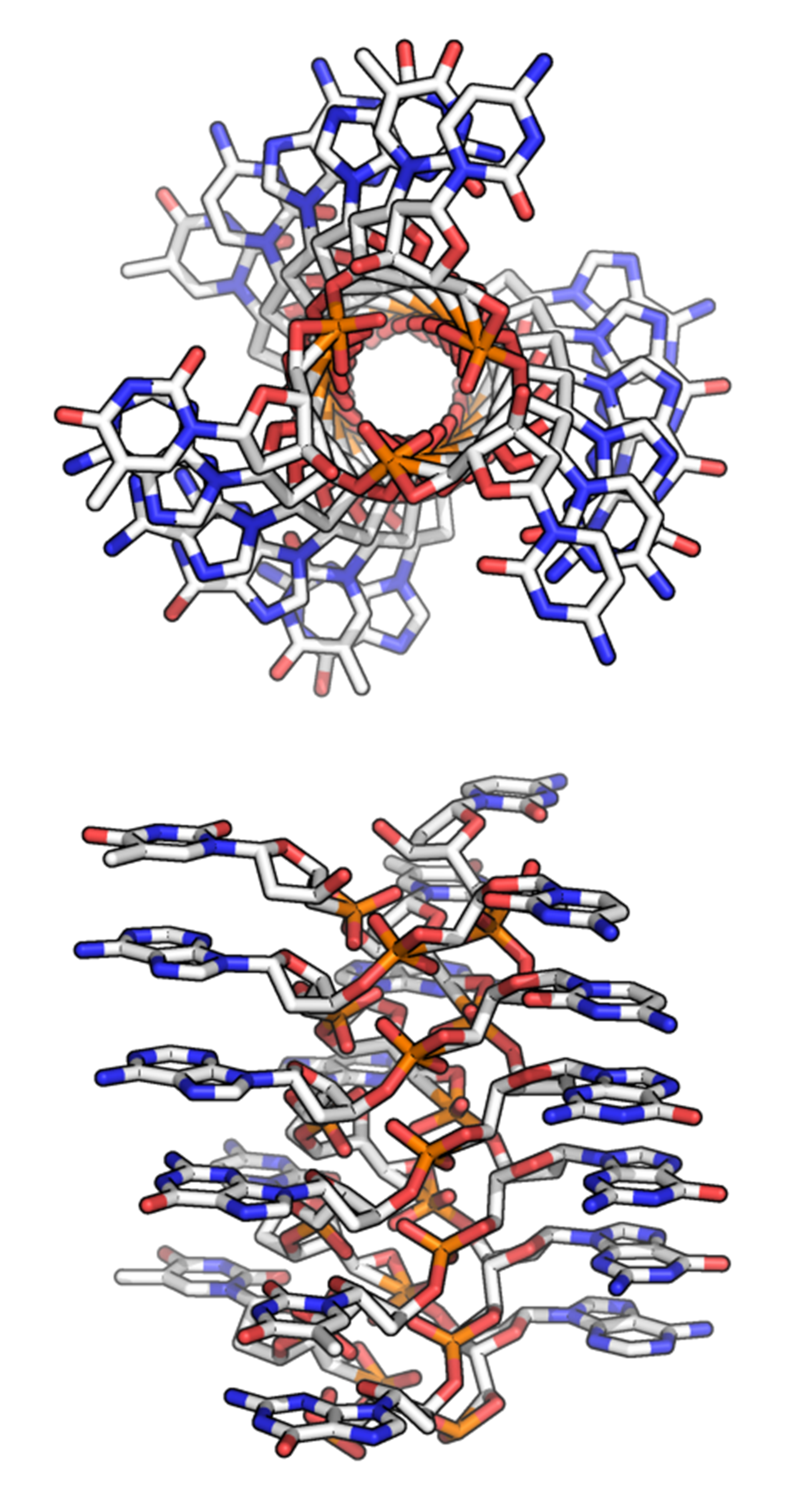
Early speculative triple-helix structure (1953)

== Prior to Watson–Crick structure ==
The DNA double helix was discovered in 1953 (with further details in 1954) based on X-ray diffraction images of DNA (most notably photo 51, taken by Raymond Gosling and Rosalind Franklin) as well as base-pairing chemical and biochemical information. Prior to this, X-ray data being gathered in the 1950s indicated that DNA formed some sort of helix, but it had not yet been discovered what the exact structure of that helix was. There were therefore several proposed structures that were later overturned by the data supporting a DNA duplex. The most famous of these early models was by Linus Pauling and Robert Corey in 1953 in which they proposed a triple helix with the phosphate backbone on the inside, and the nucleotide bases pointing outwards. A broadly similar, but detailed structure was also proposed by Bruce Fraser that same year. However, Watson and Crick soon identified several problems with these models:

- Negatively charged phosphates near the axis repel each other, leaving the question of how the three-chain structure stays together.
- In a triple-helix model (specifically Pauling and Corey's model), some of the van der Waals distances appear to be too small.

The initial double helix model discovered, now termed B-form DNA is by far the most common conformation in cells. Two additional rarer helical conformations that also naturally occur were identified in the 1970s: A-form DNA, and Z-form DNA.

== Non-helical structure proposals ==
=== Before the discovery of topoisomerases ===
Linear tetraplex model proposal (1969)

Even once the DNA duplex structure was solved, it was initially an open question whether additional DNA structures were needed to explain its overall topology. there were initially questions about how it might affect DNA replication. In 1963, autoradiographs of the E. coli chromosome demonstrated that it was a single circular molecule that is replicated at a pair of replication forks at which both new DNA strands are being synthesized. The two daughter chromosomes after replication would therefore be topologically linked. The separation of the two linked daughter DNA strands during replication either required DNA to have a net-zero helical twist, or for the strands to be cut, crossed, and rejoined. It was this apparent contradictions that early non-helical models attempted to address until the discovery of topoisomerases in 1970 resolved the problem.

In the 1960s and 1970s, a number of structures were hypothesised that would give a net-zero helical twist over the length of the DNA, either by being fully straight throughout or by alternating right-handed and left-handed helical twists. For example, in 1969, a linear tetramer structure was hypothesised, and in 1976, a structure with alternating sections of right-handed and left-handed helix was independently proposed by two different groups. The alternating twists model was initially presented with the helicity changing every half turn, but later long stretches of each helical direction were later proposed. However, these models suffered from a lack of experimental support. Under torsional stress, a Z-DNA structure can form with opposite twist to B-form DNA, but this is rare within the cellular environment. The discovery of topoisomerases and gyrases, enzymes that can change the linking number of circular nucleic acids and thus "unwind" and "rewind" the replicating bacterial chromosome, solved the topological objections to the B-form DNA helical structure. Indeed, in the absence of these topology-altering enzymes, small circular viral and plasmid DNA are inseparable supporting structure whose strands are topologically locked together.

Non-helical DNA proposals have therefore dropped from mainstream science.

Side-By-Side model structure proposal (1976)

=== Confirmation of helical structure ===
Initially, there had been questions of whether the solved DNA structures were artefacts of the X-ray crystallography techniques used. However, the structure of DNA was subsequently confirmed in solution via gel electrophoretic methods and later via solution NMR and AFM indicating that the crystallography process did not distort it. The structure of DNA in complex with nucleosomes, helicases, and numerous other DNA binding proteins also supported its biological relevance in vivo.
