= Photograph 51 =

Photograph 51 can refer to:

- Photograph 51 (play), by Anna Ziegler
- Photo 51, an X-ray image of a strand of DNA taken in 1952 that was critical in determining the structure of DNA
