= Life Story (film) =

1987 British television film

- VHS cover art using the alternate U.S. title
- Genre: Documentary
- Based on: The Double Helix: A Personal Account of the Discovery of the Structure of DNA by James Watson
- Written by: William Nicholson
- Directed by: Mick Jackson
- Starring: Jeff Goldblum; Tim Pigott-Smith
- Music by: Peter Howell
- Country of origin: United Kingdom
- Original language: English

Production
- Producer: Mick Jackson
- Cinematography: Andrew Dunn
- Editors: Robin Brightwell; Jim Latham
- Running time: 107 minutes
- Production companies: A+E Networks; BBC; Horizon Films

Original release
- Release: 14 September 1987

Life Story (known in a much-shortened version in the United States as The Race for the Double Helix) is a 1987 television historical drama which depicts the progress toward, and the competition for, the discovery of the structure of DNA in the early 1950s. It was directed by Mick Jackson for the BBC's Horizon science series, and stars Jeff Goldblum, Tim Pigott-Smith, Juliet Stevenson, and Alan Howard. It won several awards in the UK and U.S., including the 1988 BAFTA TV Award for Best Single Drama.

== Summary ==
The film dramatises the rivalries of the two teams of scientists attempting to discover the structure of DNA: Francis Crick and James D. Watson at Cambridge University; and Maurice Wilkins and Rosalind Franklin at King's College London. They are also competing with other scientists in the UK, and with international scientists such as American Linus Pauling.

The film manages to convey the loneliness and competitiveness of scientific research but also educates the viewer about how DNA's structure was discovered. It explores the tension between the patient, dedicated laboratory work of Franklin and the sometimes uninformed intuitive leaps of Watson and Crick, against a background of institutional turf wars, personality conflicts, and sexism.

The film also highlights many examples of social injustice such as exemplifying gender binary system that supports male norming. The film shows many instances in which they highlight that due to a male built society James Watson and Francis Crick were able to pull ahead in the discovery.

In the film, Watson, extolling the path of intuition, says: "Blessed are they who believed before there was any evidence." It also shows how Watson and Crick made their discovery, overtaking their competitors in part by reasoning from genetic function to predict chemical structure, helping to establish the field of molecular biology.

== Cast ==
- Jeff Goldblum as James Watson
- Tim Pigott-Smith as Francis Crick
- Juliet Stevenson as Rosalind Franklin
- Alan Howard as Maurice Wilkins
- Nicholas Fry as Raymond Gosling
- John Moreno as Vittorio Luzzati
- Geoffrey Chater as Lawrence Bragg
- Lyndon Brook as Erwin Chargaff
- Betsy Brantley as Elizabeth Watson (James Watson's sister)
- Anthony Benson as J. T. Randall
- Vincent Marzello as Peter Pauling (Linus Pauling's son)

== Production ==
The film script was written by William Nicholson, based on James Watson's 1968 memoir The Double Helix: A Personal Account of the Discovery of the Structure of DNA. It was produced and directed by Mick Jackson for Horizon, the long-running British documentary television series on BBC Two that covers science and philosophy. The film was produced by the BBC in association with the American A&E network

Original music was composed for the film by Peter Howell of the BBC Radiophonic Workshop. The main music theme is the Le Grand Choral by Georges Delerue, first used in the 1973 French film Day for Night directed by Truffaut.

Detailed 1950s-style molecular models were recreated for the film.

== Accuracy ==
In his book What Mad Pursuit, Francis Crick wrote that there were a few inaccuracies, such as portraying Watson as too manic and as always chewing gum, but wrote that overall "it tells a good story at a good pace so that people from all walks of life can enjoy it and absorb some of its lessons. All in all, Life Story must be considered a success. In other hands it could easily have been nothing quite as good."

== Video recordings ==
The film has had a number of VHS and DVD releases, but most have been exclusively for institutional educational use and are held by the libraries of colleges and universities. A VHS in PAL format, with the title Life Story, was produced for the educational market. A shortened 90-minute VHS in NTSC format was produced in 1993 by EDDE Entertainment under the title The Race for the Double Helix. In the 2000s, Films for the Humanities & Sciences produced a full-length DVD exclusively for the institutional and educational market, under the title Double Helix.

In December 2024, the film was made available on the BBC iPlayer in a new HD transfer.
