= Non-B database =

Non-B DB

Content
- Description: predicted non-B DNA-forming motifs in mammalian genomes.

Contact
- Laboratory: Advanced Biomedical Computing Center, Information Systems Program
- Authors: Regina Z Cer
- Primary citation: Cer & al. (2011)
- Release date: 2010

Access
- Website: http://nonb.abcc.ncifcrf.gov.

Non-B DB is a database integrating annotations and analysis of non-B DNA-forming sequence motifs. The database provides alternative DNA structure predictions including Z-DNA motifs, quadruplex-forming motifs, inverted repeats, mirror repeats and direct repeats and their associated subsets of cruciforms, triplex and slipped structures, respectively.

== See also ==
- B-DNA
- non-B DNA
