= Florence Bell =

Florence Bell may refer to:

- Florence Bell (writer) (1851–1930), British writer and playwright
- Florence Bell (scientist) (1913–2000), British DNA researcher
- Florence Bell (skier) (born 1996), British alpine skier
- Florence Harrison Bell (1865–1948), British socialist and suffragist activist
