= Herbert Wilson =

British physicist (1929–2008)

Herbert R. Wilson
- Wilson with the double helix A-DNA molecular model
- Born: 20 March 1929; Pwllheli, Wales
- Died: 22 May 2008 (aged 79); Stirling, Scotland
- Education: Bangor University
- Awards: Fellow of The Royal Society of Edinburgh
- Scientific career
- Fields: Physics and biophysics
- Workplaces: King's College London, Queen's College at the University of Dundee, University of St. Andrews, University of Stirling

Herbert Rees Wilson FRSE (20 March 1929 – 22 May 2008) was a physicist, who was one of the team who worked on the structure of DNA at King's College London, under the direction of Sir John Randall.

== Biography ==
=== Early life ===
He was born the son of a sea captain at Nefyn on the Llŷn Peninsula and educated at Nefyn school and Pwllheli Grammar School. He entered Bangor University, where he gained a first class honours degree in physics in 1949 and a PhD in 1952 under the supervision of Professor Edwin Owen.

=== College education ===
Having received a University of Wales fellowship, Wilson joined Maurice Wilkins at King's College London in September 1952. The work involved X-ray diffraction studies of DNA, nucleoproteins and cell nuclei. Prior to the double helix model, their studies showed that DNAs from different sources (including biologically active transforming principle) had essentially the same structure, and confirmed that the phosphate groups were on the outside of the molecule.

=== Scientific discoveries and achievements ===
Three papers were published in Nature, April 1953, to announce a structure for DNA. Maurice Wilkins, Alex Stokes and Wilson published their paper in the same issue as the paper from Rosalind Franklin and Raymond Gosling, and the paper by Francis Crick and James Watson. The 1962 Nobel Prize for Physiology or Medicine was subsequently jointly awarded to Francis Crick, James Watson, and Maurice Wilkins.

In his autobiography The Third Man of The Double Helix, Maurice Wilkins does not specifically credit Stokes, Wilson and several other co-authors of his papers in Nature. Whether this was deliberate on his part or just rather poor sub-editing by OUP is debatable. It is most likely to have been a matter of expedience, as there were more than five co-authors on several of his later papers on the subject published in Nature or, later, in the Journal of Molecular Biology. Nevertheless, both he and Alex Stokes are now recognized at King's College as two of the eight key researchers that contributed to the discovery of the structure of the A-DNA crystalline structure.

Following the publication of the double helical structure in 1953, Wilson participated in the refinement of the DNA structure in Wilkins' group. In 1957 Wilson was appointed as a lecturer in physics at Queen's College, Dundee, then part of the University of St Andrews and as a senior lecturer in 1964. Queen's College became the University of Dundee in 1967, and in 1973 he was appointed reader in physics by the university. In 1962 he was visiting research associate at the Children's Cancer Research Foundation, Boston, Massachusetts. In 1983 he was appointed professor of physics at the University of Stirling from which he retired as emeritus professor in 1994. His research at Dundee and Stirling has involved X-ray crystallographic studies of nucleic acid components and their analogues, and structural studies of flexuous viruses. He was awarded an Honorary Fellowship by the University of Wales, Bangor in 2005. In 1975 he was elected a Fellow of the Royal Society of Edinburgh.

As a Welshman Herbert was honoured in 2003 at the National Eisteddfod in Wales by being given the official white robe of the Gorsedd of Bards.

After suffering from terminal cancer, Wilson died on 22 May 2008. He was survived by his wife, two daughters, and two grandchildren; his son Neil predeceased him in 1996.

== Books and articles ==
=== Books ===
- Herbert R. Wilson. 1966. Diffraction of X-rays by Proteins, Nucleic Acids and Viruses., London: Arnold publs.

=== Original articles ===
- Wilkins, M.H.F., Stokes, A.R. and H.R. Wilson.(1953). Nature, 171, 737.
- Wilkins, M.H.F., Seeds, W.E., Stokes, A.R. and H.R. Wilson.(1953). Nature, 171, 759.
- Wilkins, M.H.F., Zubay, G. and H.R. Wilson. (1959). J. Mol. Biol., 1, 179.
- H.R. Wilson. (with Feughelman, M., & Langridge, R. et al.).(1955). Nature, 175, 834.
- H.R. Wilson. (with Langridge, R. et al.). (1960). J. Mol. Biol., 2, 19.
- H.R. Wilson. (with Langridge, R, et al.). (1960). J. Mol. Biol., 2, 38.
- H.R. Wilson. (with Fuller, W. et al.). (1965). J. Mol. Biol., 12, 60.

== Featured in books ==
- Chomet, S. (Ed.), D.N.A. Genesis of a Discovery, 1994, Newman- Hemisphere Press, London; NB a few copies are available from Newman-Hemisphere at 101 Swan Court, London SW3 5RY.
- Wilkins, Maurice, The Third Man of the Double Helix: The Autobiography of Maurice Wilkins ISBN 0-19-860665-6.
- Ridley, Matt; "Francis Crick: Discoverer of the Genetic Code (Eminent Lives)" was first published in June 2006 in the US and then in the UK September 2006, by HarperCollins Publishers; 192 pp, ISBN 0-06-082333-X. [This short book is in the publisher's "Eminent Lives" series.]
- Contributed book: Mathematical and Experimental Biophysicists: Biographies and Related Fields, (Bci2, ed.), pp. 382, 31 January 2010, v.7. in Wikipedia
- Tait, Sylvia & James "A Quartet of Unlikely Discoveries" (Athena Press 2004) ISBN 1-84401-343-X
