= Non B-DNA =

Non-B DNA is DNA in any conformation other than the canonical (B-DNA) conformation, the most common form of DNA found in nature at neutral pH and physiological salt concentrations. Non-B DNA structures can arise due to various factors, including DNA sequence, length, supercoiling, and environmental conditions. Non-B DNA structures can have important biological roles, but they can also cause problems, such as genomic instability and disease.

== Types of Non-B DNA ==
Non-B DNA can be classified into several types, including A-DNA, Z-DNA, H-DNA, G-quadruplexes, and Triplexes (Triple-stranded DNA).

A-DNA is a right-handed double helix structure for RNA-DNA duplexes and RNA-RNA duplexes that is less common than the more well-known B-DNA structure. A-DNA is a form of DNA that occurs when the DNA is in a dehydrated state or is bound to certain proteins, and it has a shorter and wider helix than B-DNA. The helix of A-DNA is also tilted and compressed compared to B-DNA. A-DNA is believed to play a role in certain biological processes, such as DNA replication and gene expression.

Z-DNA is a left-handed helix with a zigzag backbone, in contrast to the right-handed B-DNA helix. It is stabilized by the alternating purine-pyrimidine sequence and can form in regions of DNA with high GC-content, supercoiling, or negative superhelicity. Z-DNA has been implicated in gene regulation and immunity, but it can also induce DNA damage and inflammation.

H-DNA is a triple-stranded DNA structure that forms when two homologous DNA strands come together and one strand displaces the other. H-DNA is stabilized by Hoogsteen base pairing and can cause mutations, rearrangements, and genome instability. H-DNA is thought to be involved in DNA replication, recombination, and repair, but its precise biological functions remain unclear.

G-quadruplexes are four-stranded DNA structures formed by guanine-rich sequences. G-quadruplexes can form in telomeres, oncogene promoters, and other genomic regions and can affect gene expression, DNA replication, and telomere maintenance. G-quadruplexes are also potential targets for cancer therapy.

Triplexes are three-stranded DNA structures formed by the binding of a third strand to a DNA duplex. Triplexes can be formed by pyrimidine-rich or purine-rich third strands, and they can occur in genomic regions with inverted repeats, mirror repeats, or other special sequences. Triplexes can affect DNA replication, transcription, and recombination, but they can also cause DNA damage and mutagenesis.

== Implications of Non-B DNA ==
Non-B DNA can have significant implications for DNA biology and human health. For example, Z-DNA has been implicated in immunity and autoimmune diseases, such as lupus and arthritis. H-DNA has been implicated in genomic instability and cancer, and G-quadruplexes have been linked to telomere maintenance, oncogene activation, and cancer. Triplexes have been associated with genetic diseases, such as fragile X syndrome and Huntington's disease.
