= Robert Olby =

British historian (1933–2020)

Robert Cecil Olby (4 October 1933 – 31 December 2020) was a British research professor in the Department of History and Philosophy of Science at the University of Pittsburgh. Formerly Reader at the University of Leeds, UK, Robert Olby was a historian of 19th and 20th century biology, his specialist fields being genetics and molecular biology. With the assistance of Martin Packer, Olby completed an authorized biography of the late Francis Crick. It is entitled Francis Crick: Hunter of Life's Secrets, after an article in The New York Times on 2 February 1962. Olby was born in Beckenham on 4 October 1933, and died in Willow Spring, North Carolina on 31 December 2020, at the age of 87.

== Books and papers by Robert Olby ==
- Charles Darwin; Oxford University Press, London, 1967, 64pp.
- Early Nineteenth Century European Scientists; Pergamon Press, 1967, 179pp. ISBN 0-415-14578-3
- The Origins of Mendelism; Constable 1966. 204 pages ISBN 0-226-62592-3
- The Twentieth Century Sciences, Studies in the Biography of Ideas, edited by Gerald Holton; W.W. Norton & Co., New York 1972: article "Francis Crick, DNA, and the Central Dogma".
- 'Rosalind Elsie Franklin' biography in Dictionary of Scientific Biography, ed. Charles C. Gillespie (New York: Charles Scribner's Sons) ISBN 0-684-10121-1
- The Path to the Double Helix: The Discovery of DNA; University of Washington Press, Seattle 1974 (revised 1994) ISBN 0-486-68117-3
- Companion to the History of Modern Science (ed.); Routledge, London, 1990, 1081pp. ISBN 0-415-01988-5
- "Robert Darlington: Forgotten Prophet of Genetics", American Scientist Nov-Dec 2004
- "Quiet debut for the double helix" Nature 421 (23 January 2003): 402–405.
- Oxford Dictionary of National Biography:‘Huxley, Sir Julian Sorell (1887–1975)’, first published Sept 2004, 2680 words
- Oxford Dictionary of National Biography: ‘Bernal, (John) Desmond (1901–1971)’, first published Sept 2004, 2870 words, with portrait illustration
- "Francis Crick: Hunter of Life's Secrets", Cold Spring Harbor Laboratory Press, ISBN 978-0-87969-798-3, published 25 August 2009; 450 pp; and Peter Lawrence's review in "Current Biology".
- 'Crick, Francis Harry Compton (1916–2004)', Oxford Dictionary of National Biography, online edn, Oxford University Press, Jan. 2008
- 'Perutz, Max Ferdinand (1914-2002)', Oxford Dictionary of National Biography, online edn, Oxford University Press, Jan. 2008
- 'Wilkins, Maurice Hugh Frederick (1916-2004)', Oxford Dictionary of National Biography, online edn, Oxford University Press, Jan. 2008

== See also ==
- History of biology
- Charles Darwin
- Gregor Mendel
