= Photo 51 =

1952 X-ray diffraction photograph of DNA

Photo 51, showing X-ray diffraction pattern of DNA

Photo 51 is a 1952 X-ray based fiber diffraction image of a paracrystalline gel composed of DNA fiber taken at King's College London by Rosalind Franklin and her PhD student Raymond Gosling while working in Sir John Randall's group; Maurice Wilkins later shared the image with James Watson without their permission. The image was tagged "photo 51" because it was the 51st diffraction photograph that Gosling had taken. It was critical evidence in identifying the structure of DNA.

== Use in discovering structure of DNA ==
Photo 51 was taken by Rosalind Franklin and Raymond Gosling on 2 May 1952. According to a later account by Gosling, although Photo 51 was an exceptionally clear diffraction pattern of the "B" form of DNA, Franklin was more interested in solving the diffraction pattern of the "A" form of DNA, so she put Gosling's Photo 51 to the side. When it had been decided that Franklin would leave King's College, and with Gosling now reporting to Wilkins, Gosling showed the photograph to Maurice Wilkins (who would become Gosling's advisor after Franklin left).

A few days later, Wilkins showed the photo to James Watson after Gosling had returned to working under Wilkins' supervision. Franklin did not know this at the time because she was leaving King's College London. Randall, the head of the group, had asked Gosling to share all his data with Wilkins. Watson recognized the pattern as a helix because his co-worker Francis Crick had previously published a paper of what the diffraction pattern of a helix would be. Watson and Crick used characteristics and features of Photo 51, together with evidence from multiple other sources, to develop the chemical model of the DNA molecule. Their model, along with papers by Wilkins and colleagues, and by Gosling and Franklin, were first published, together, in 1953, in the same issue of Nature.

In 1962, the Nobel Prize in Physiology or Medicine was awarded to Watson, Crick and Wilkins. The prize was not awarded to Franklin; she had died four years earlier, and although there was not yet a rule against posthumous awards, the Nobel Committee never makes posthumous nominations. Gosling's work also was not cited by the prize committee.

The photograph provided key information that was essential for developing a model of DNA. The diffraction pattern determined the helical nature of the double helix strands (antiparallel). The outside of the DNA chain has a backbone of alternating deoxyribose and phosphate moieties, and the base pairs, the order of which provides codes for protein building and thereby inheritance, are inside the helix. Watson and Crick's calculations from Gosling and Franklin's photography gave crucial values for the size and structure of the helix.

Photo 51 became a crucial data source that led to the development of the DNA model and confirmed the prior postulated double helical structure of DNA, which were presented in the series of three articles in the journal Nature in 1953.

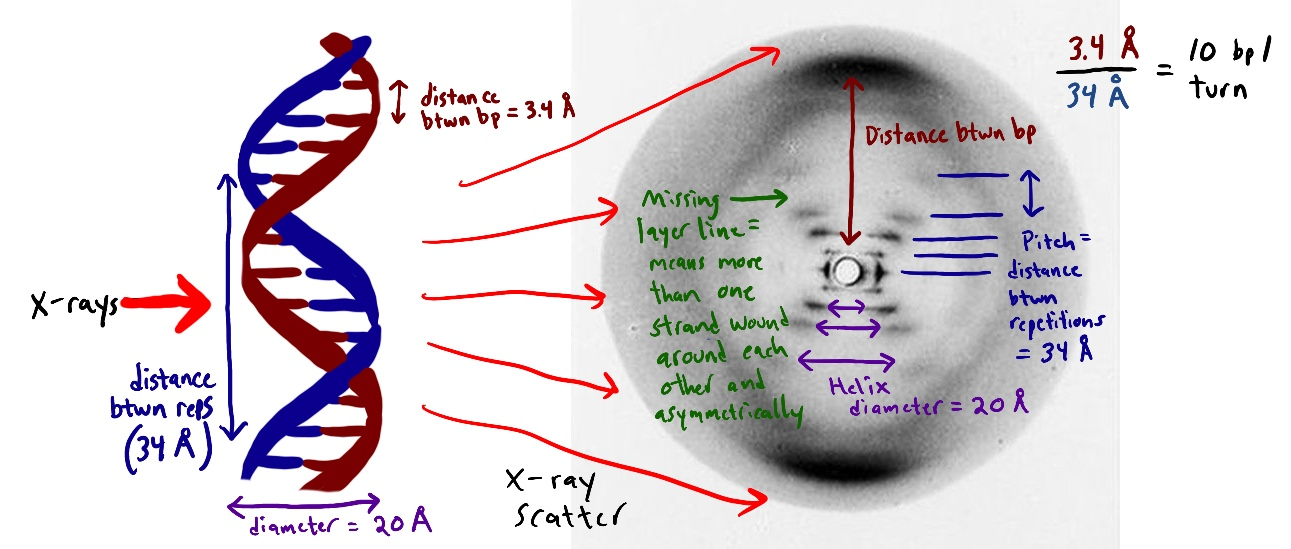
Cartoon explanation of how Photo 51 captured the double helix structure of DNA.

As historians of science have re-examined the period during which this image was obtained, considerable controversy has arisen over both the significance of the contribution of this image to the work of Watson and Crick, as well as the methods by which they obtained the image. Franklin had been hired independently of Maurice Wilkins, who, taking over as Gosling's new supervisor, showed Photo 51 to Watson and Crick without Franklin's knowledge. Whether Franklin would have deduced the structure of DNA on her own, from her own data, had Watson and Crick not obtained Gosling's image, is a hotly debated topic, made more controversial by the negative caricature of Franklin presented in the early chapters of Watson's history of the research on DNA structure, The Double Helix. Watson admitted his distortion of Franklin in his book, noting in the epilogue:

Since my initial impressions about [Franklin], both scientific and personal (as recorded in the early pages of this book) were often wrong, I want to say something here about her achievements.

== Cultural references ==
- A 107-minute documentary, Life Story, BBC Horizon science series 1987, starring Juliet Stevenson as Rosalind Franklin, Nicholas Fry as Raymond Gosling, and Jeff Goldblum as Watson.
- A 56-minute documentary, DNA – Secret of Photo 51, was broadcast in 2003 on PBS NOVA. Narrated by Sigourney Weaver, the program features interviews with Wilkins, Gosling, Aaron Klug, Brenda Maddox, including Franklin's friends Vittorio Luzzati, Donald Caspar, Anne Piper, and Sue Richley. The UK version produced by the BBC is titled Rosalind Franklin: DNA's Dark Lady.
- The first episode of a PBS documentary serial, DNA, which aired on 4 January 2004 as "The Secret of Life", centres on and features the contributions of Franklin. Narrated by Jeff Goldblum, it features Watson, Wilkins, Gosling and Peter Pauling (son of Linus Pauling).
- A play entitled Photograph 51 by Anna Ziegler focuses on the role of X-ray crystallographer Rosalind Franklin in the discovery of the structure of DNA. This play won the third STAGE International Script Competition in 2008. In 2015, the play was put on at London West End, with Nicole Kidman playing Franklin.

== See also ==
- List of photographs considered the most important
