= The Double Helix =

Book by James Watson

- First US edition
- Author: James Watson
- Language: English
- Subject: History of science
- Genre: Autobiography
- Published: 1968
- Publisher: Atheneum Press (US), Weidenfeld & Nicolson (UK)
- Publication place: United States
- Media type: Book
- Pages: 226
- ISBN: 0-451-03770-7
- OCLC: 439345
- Dewey Decimal: 574.87/3282
- LC Class: QU58W339d 1968

The Double Helix: A Personal Account of the Discovery of the Structure of DNA is an autobiographical account of the discovery of the double helix structure of DNA written by James D. Watson and published in 1968. It has earned both critical and public praise, along with continuing controversy about credit for the Nobel award and attitudes towards female scientists at the time of the discovery.

== Significance ==
Watson was an American molecular biologist, geneticist and zoologist, best known as one of the co-discoverers of the structure of DNA in 1953 with Francis Crick.

In 1998, the Modern Library placed The Double Helix at number 7 on its list of the 100 best nonfiction books of the 20th century. In 2012, The Double Helix was named as one of the 88 "Books That Shaped America" by the Library of Congress.

Since its publication, The Double Helix has been a controversial account. Although it was originally slated to be published by Harvard University Press, Watson's home university, Harvard dropped the arrangement after protestations from Francis Crick and Maurice Wilkins, co-discoverers of the structure of DNA, and it was published instead by Atheneum in the United States and Weidenfeld & Nicolson in the UK.

The intimate first-person memoir about scientific discovery was unusual for its time. The book has been hailed for its highly personal view of scientific work, and has been criticised as caring only about the glory of priority, with critics claiming that Watson was willing to appropriate data from others surreptitiously in order to obtain it. It has also been criticized as being disagreeably sexist towards Rosalind Franklin, another participant in the discovery, who was deceased by the time Watson's book was written.

The events described in the book were dramatized in a BBC television program Life Story (known as The Race for the Double Helix in the U.S.).

== Criticism ==
The book leaned heavily on personalities, and some, like Rosalind Franklin, were treated cartoonishly.

— Burton Feldman

A 1980 Norton Critical Edition of The Double Helix edited by Gunther Stent, analyzed the events surrounding its initial publication. It presents a selection of both positive and negative reviews of the book, by such figures as Philip Morrison, Richard Lewontin, Alex Comfort, Jacob Bronowski, and more in-depth analyses by Peter Medawar, Robert K. Merton, and Andre Lwoff. Erwin Chargaff declined permission to reprint his unsympathetic review from the March 29, 1968, issue of Science, but letters in response from Max Perutz, Maurice Wilkins, and Watson are printed. Also included are retrospectives from a 1974 edition of Nature written by Francis Crick and Linus Pauling, and an analysis of Franklin's work by her student Aaron Klug. The Norton edition concludes with the 1953 papers on DNA structure as published in Nature.

In the book Rosalind Franklin and DNA, author Anne Sayre is very critical of Watson's account. She claims that Watson's book did not give a balanced description of Rosalind Franklin and the nature of her interactions with Maurice Wilkins at King's College, London. Sayre's book raises doubts about the ethics of how Watson and Crick used some of Franklin's results and whether adequate credit was given to her. Watson had very limited contact with Franklin during the time she worked on DNA. By providing more information about Franklin's life than was included in Watson's book, it was possible for Sayre to provide a different perspective on the role Franklin played in Watson and Crick's discovery of the double helix structure of DNA. (See: King's College London DNA Controversy.)

In the book's preface, Watson explains that he is describing his impressions at the time of the events, and not at the time he wrote the book. In the epilogue Watson writes; "Since my initial impressions about [Franklin], both scientific and personal (as recorded in the early pages of this book) were often wrong I want to say something here about her achievements." He goes on to describe her superb work, and, despite this, the enormous barriers she faced as a woman in the field of science. He also acknowledged that it took years to overcome their bickering before he could appreciate Franklin's generosity and integrity.

== An annotated and illustrated edition ==
An annotated and illustrated version of the book, edited by Alex Gann and Jan Witkowski, was published in November 2012 by Simon & Schuster in association with Cold Spring Harbor Laboratory Press. The new edition coincided with the fiftieth anniversary of the award of the 1962 Nobel Prize for physiology or medicine to Francis Crick, James D. Watson and Maurice Wilkins. It contains over three hundred annotations on the events and characters portrayed, with facsimile letters and contemporary photographs, many previously unpublished. Their sources include newly discovered correspondence from Crick, the papers of Franklin, Pauling, and Wilkins, and they include a chapter dropped from the original edition that described Watson's holiday in the Italian Alps in 1952. The edition was favorably reviewed in The New York Times by Nicholas Wade who commented, "anyone seeking to understand modern biology and genomics could do much worse than start with the discovery of the structure of DNA, on which almost everything else is based. This edition includes several appendices, including letters by Crick and Watson giving the first account of the discovery, a previously unpublished chapter, an account of the controversy surrounding the publication, and the unsympathetic review by the late Erwin Chargaff from the March 29, 1968, issue of Science, which he previously declined permission to reprint in the 1980 Norton Critical Edition of The Double Helix edited by Gunther Stent.

The book does not include the four press cuttings from the News Chronicle, Varsity and The New York Times (2) of May and June 1953 regarding the discovery of the structure of DNA, and Crick's letter of 13th April 1967 is incomplete.

== Film adaptation ==
In 1987, the memoir was adapted as a 107-minute television docudrama called Life Story for the BBC, airing on Horizon, the long-running British documentary television series on BBC Two that covers science and philosophy. The script was written by William Nicholson, and it was produced and directed by Mick Jackson. Jeff Goldblum starred as Watson, with Tim Pigott-Smith as Francis Crick, Juliet Stevenson as Rosalind Franklin, and Alan Howard as Maurice Wilkins.

The film won several awards in the UK and U.S., including the 1988 BAFTA TV Award as the Best Single Drama.
