= John Randall (physicist) =

British physicist (1905–1984)

Sir John Randall FRS FRSE
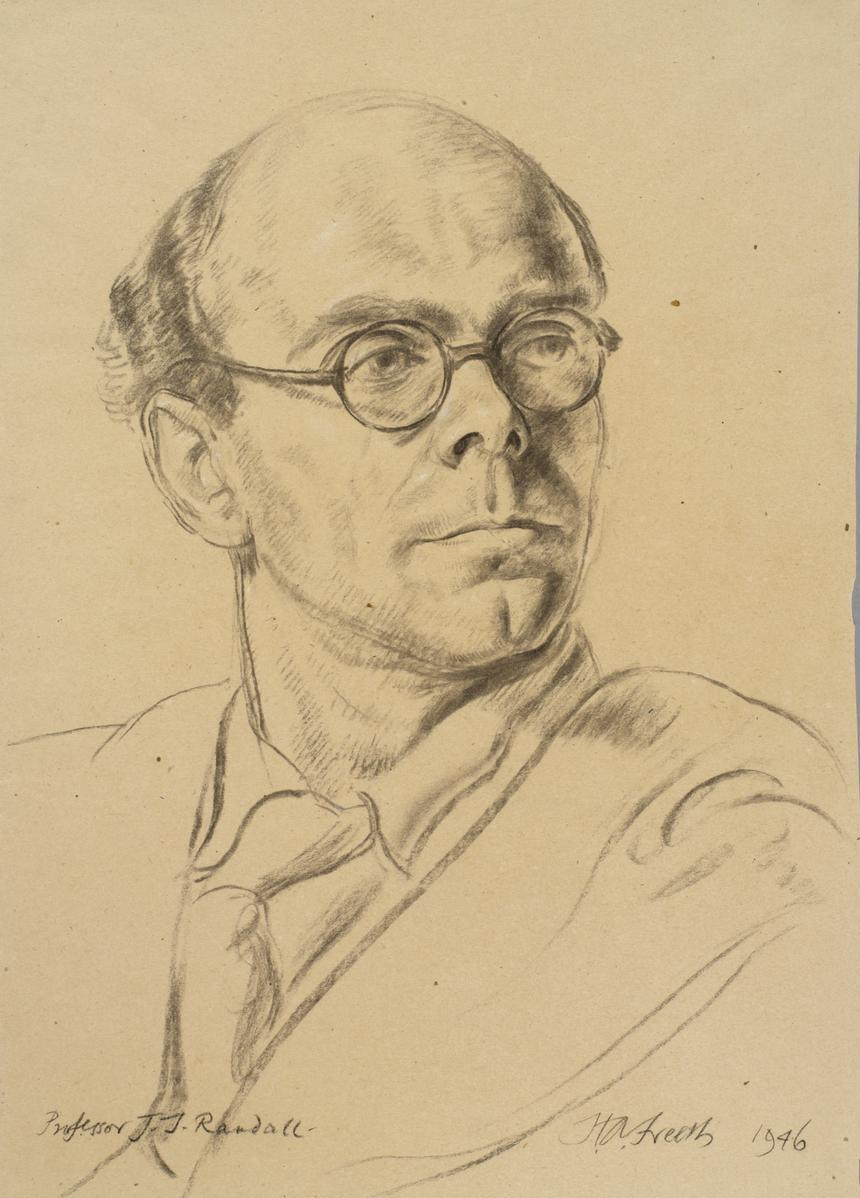
- Portrait drawn by Andrew Freeth (1946)
- Born: John Turton Randall; 23 March 1905; Newton-le-Willows, Lancashire, England
- Died: 16 June 1984 (aged 79)
- Education: Victoria University of Manchester (BSc, MSc, DSc)
- Known for: Cavity magnetron DNA structure determination neutron diffraction studies of labelled proteins
- Awards: Duddell Medal and Prize (1945); Hughes Medal (1946); John Price Wetherill Medal (1958)
- Scientific career
- Fields: Physics; Biophysics
- Workplaces: General Electric Company plc University of Cambridge; King's College, London; University of St Andrews; University of Birmingham; University of Edinburgh
- Doctoral students: Maurice Wilkins

Sir John Turton Randall, FRS FRSE (23 March 1905 – 16 June 1984) was an English physicist and biophysicist, credited with radical improvement of the cavity magnetron, an essential component of centimetric wavelength radar, which was one of the keys to the Allied victory in the Second World War. It is also the key component of microwave ovens.

Randall collaborated with Harry Boot, and they produced a valve that could spit out pulses of microwave radio energy on a wavelength of 10 cm. On the significance of their invention, Professor of military history at the University of Victoria in British Columbia, David Zimmerman, states: "The magnetron remains the essential radio tube for shortwave radio signals of all types. It not only changed the course of the war by allowing us to develop airborne radar systems, it remains the key piece of technology that lies at the heart of your microwave oven today. The cavity magnetron's invention changed the world."

Randall also led the King's College, London team which worked on the structure of DNA. Randall's deputy, Professor Maurice Wilkins, shared the 1962 Nobel Prize for Physiology or Medicine with James Watson and Francis Crick of the Cavendish Laboratory at the University of Cambridge for the determination of the structure of DNA. His other staff included Rosalind Franklin, Raymond Gosling, Alex Stokes and Herbert Wilson, all involved in research on DNA.

== Education and early life ==
John Randall was born on 23 March 1905 at Newton-le-Willows, Lancashire, the only son and the first of the three children of Sidney Randall, nurseryman and seedsman, and his wife, Hannah Cawley, daughter of John Turton, colliery manager in the area. He was educated at the grammar school at Ashton-in-Makerfield and at the Victoria University of Manchester, where he was awarded a first-class honours degree in physics and a graduate prize in 1925, and a Master of Science degree in 1926.

In 1928, he married Doris Duckworth.

== Career and research ==
From 1926 to 1937, Randall was employed on research by the General Electric Company at its Wembley laboratories, where he took a leading part in developing luminescent powders for use in discharge lamps. He also took an active interest in the mechanisms of such luminescence.

By 1937, he was recognised as the leading British worker in his field, and was awarded a Royal Society fellowship at the University of Birmingham, where he worked on the electron trap theory of phosphorescence in Mark Oliphant's physics faculty with Maurice Wilkins.

=== The Magnetron ===
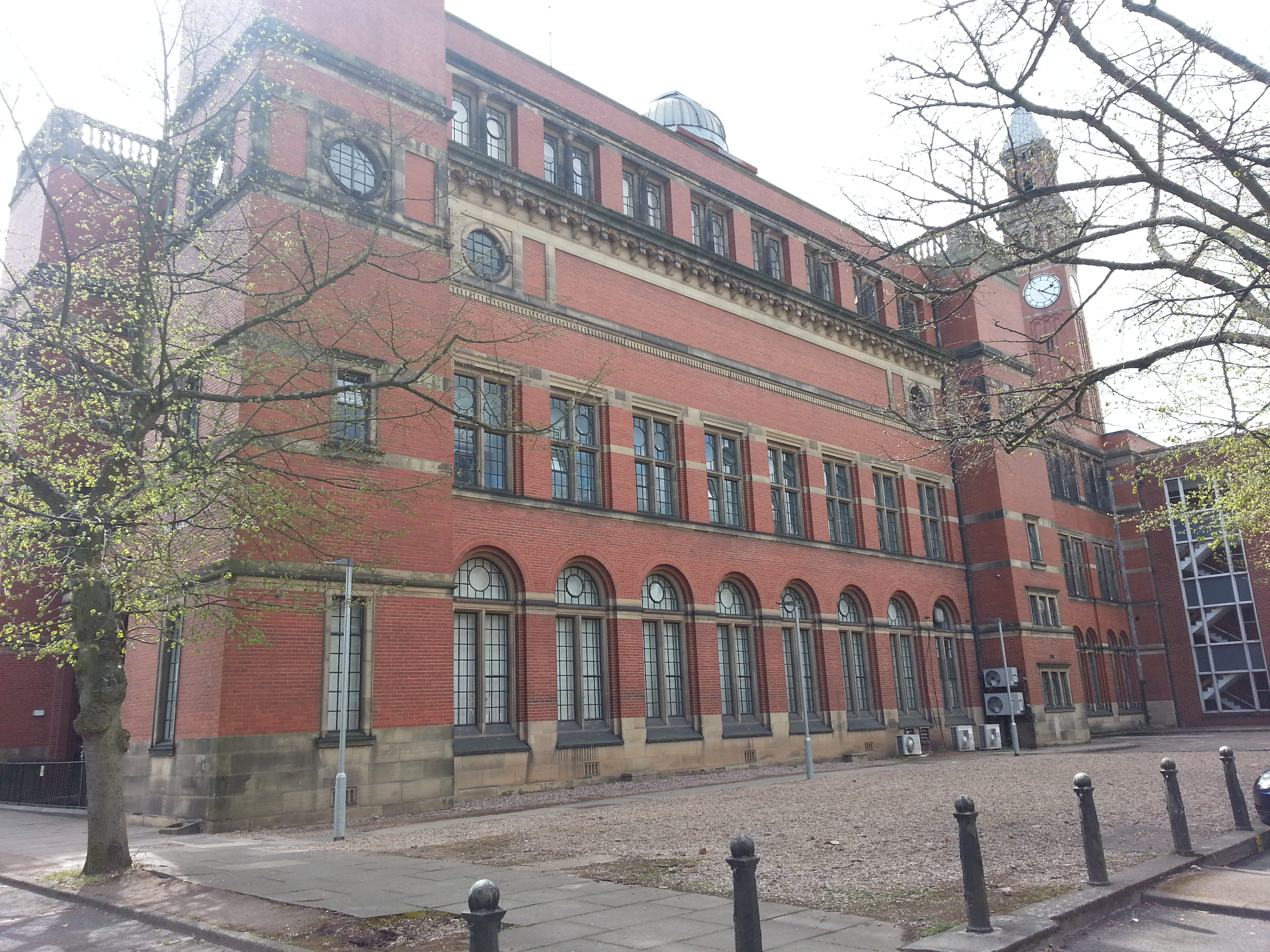
Poynting Physics Building, Birmingham University

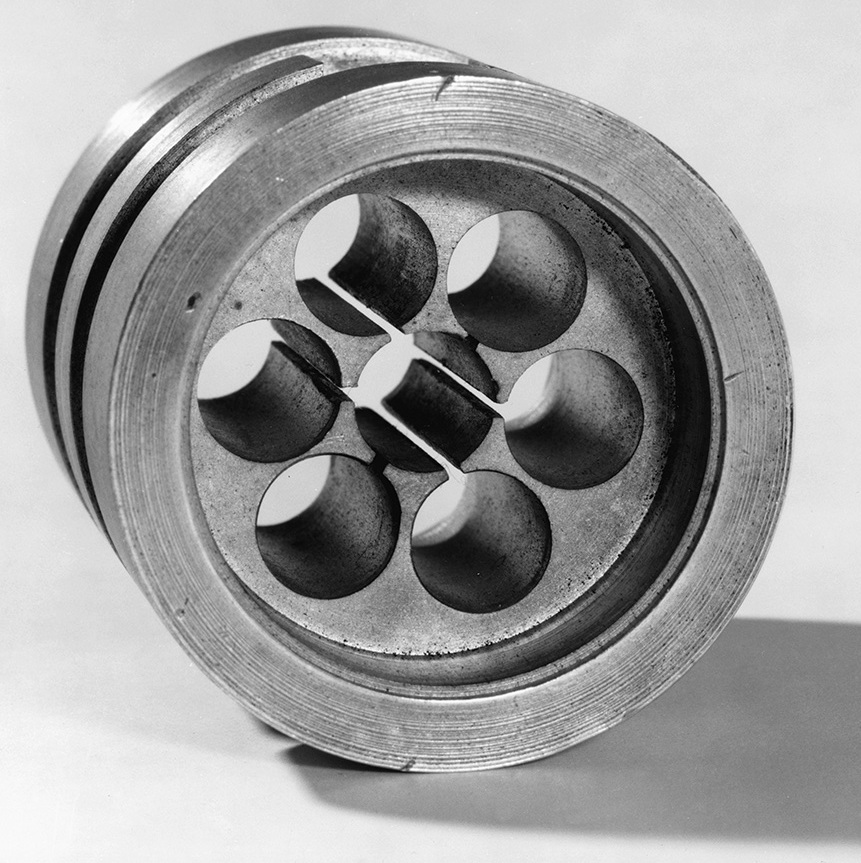
An original six-cavity magnetron.

When the war began in 1939, Oliphant was approached by the Admiralty about the possibility of building a radio source that operated at microwave frequencies. Such a system would allow a radar using it to see small objects like the periscopes of submerged U-boats. The Air Ministry radar researchers at Bawdsey Manor on the Suffolk coast had also expressed an interest in a 10 cm system, as this would greatly reduce the size of the transmission antennas, making them much easier to fit in the nose of aircraft, as opposed to being mounted on the wings and fuselage as in their current systems.

Oliphant began research using the klystron, a device introduced by Russell and Sigurd Varian between 1937 and 1939, and the only system known to efficiently generate microwaves. Klystrons of the era were very low-power devices, and Oliphant's efforts were primarily directed to greatly increasing their output. If this were successful, it created a secondary problem; the klystron was an amplifier only, so a low-power source signal was needed for it to amplify. Oliphant put Randall and Harry Boot on this issue of producing a microwave oscillator, asking them to explore miniature Barkhausen–Kurz tubes for this role, a design already used for UHF systems. Their work quickly demonstrated that these offered no improvement in the microwave range. The klystron effort soon plateaued with a device that could generate about 400 watts of microwave power, enough for testing purposes, but far short of the multi-kilowatt systems that would be required for a practical radar system.

Randall and Boot, given no other projects to work on, began considering solutions to this problem in November 1939. The only other microwave device known at that time was the split-anode magnetron, a device capable of generating small amounts of power, but with low efficiency and generally lower output than the klystron. However, they noted that it had one enormous advantage over the klystron; the klystron's signal is encoded in a stream of electrons provided by an electron gun, and it was the current capability of the gun that defined how much power the device could ultimately handle. In contrast, the magnetron used a conventional hot filament cathode, a system that was widely used in radio systems producing hundreds of kilowatts. This seemed to offer a much more likely path to higher power.

The problem with existing magnetrons was not power, but efficiency. In the klystron, a beam of electrons was passed through a metal disk known as a resonator. The mechanical layout of the copper resonator caused it to influence the electrons, speeding them up and slowing them down, releasing microwaves. This was reasonably efficient, and power was limited by the guns. In the case of the magnetron, the resonator was replaced by two metal plates held at opposite charges to cause the alternating acceleration, and the electrons were forced to travel between them using a magnet. There was no real limit to the number of electrons this could accelerate, but the microwave release process was extremely inefficient.

The two then considered what would happen if the two metal plates of the magnetron were replaced by resonators, essentially combining the existing magnetron and klystron concepts. The magnet would cause the electrons to travel in a circle, as in the case of the magnetron, so they would pass by each of the resonators, generating microwaves much more efficiently than the plate concept. Recalling that Heinrich Hertz had used loops of wire as resonators, as opposed to the disk-shaped cavities of the klystron, it seemed possible that multiple resonators could be placed around the centre of the magnetron. More importantly, there was no real limit to the number or size of these loops. One could greatly improve the power of the system by extending the loops into cylinders, the power handling then being defined by the length of the tube. Efficiency could be improved by increasing the number of resonators, as each electron could thus interact with more resonators during its orbits. The only practical limits were based on the required frequency and desired physical size of the tube.

Developed using common lab equipment, the first magnetron consisted of a copper block with six holes drilled through it to produce the resonant loops, which was then placed in a bell jar and vacuum pumped, which was itself placed between the poles of the largest horseshoe magnet they could find. A test of their new cavity magnetron design in February 1940 produced 400 watts, and within a week it had been pushed over 1000 watts. The design was then demonstrated to engineers from GEC, who were asked to try to improve it. GEC introduced a number of new industrial methods to better seal the tube and improve vacuum, and added a new oxide-coated cathode that allowed for much greater currents to be run through it. These boosted the power to 10 kW, about the same power as the conventional tube systems used in existing radar sets. The success of the magnetron revolutionised the development of radar, and almost all new radar sets from 1942 on used one.

In 1943 Randall left Oliphant's physical laboratory in Birmingham to teach for a year in the Cavendish Laboratory at Cambridge. In 1944 Randall was appointed professor of natural philosophy at University of St Andrews and began planning research in biophysics (with Maurice Wilkins) on a small Admiralty grant.

=== King's College, London ===
During his term as Director, the experimental work leading to the discovery of the structure of DNA was made there by Rosalind Franklin, Raymond Gosling, Maurice Wilkins, Alex Stokes and Herbert R. Wilson. He assigned Raymond Gosling as a PhD student to Franklin to work on DNA structure by X-ray diffraction. According to Raymond Gosling, the role of John Randall in the pursuit of the double helix cannot be overstated. Gosling felt so strongly on this subject that he wrote to The Times in 2013 during the sixtieth anniversary celebrations. Randall firmly believed that DNA held the genetic code and assembled a multi-disciplinary team to help prove it. It was Randall who pointed out that since DNA was largely carbon, nitrogen and oxygen, it was just the same as the atoms in the air in the camera. The result was a diffuse back-scattering of X-rays, which fogged the film, and so he instructed Gosling to displace all the air with hydrogen.

Maurice Wilkins shared the 1962 Nobel Prize for Physiology and Medicine with James Watson and Francis Crick; Rosalind Franklin had already died from cancer in 1958.

Randall was also successful in integrating the teaching of biosciences at King's College.

Randall himself specialised in using the electron microscope, first studying the fine structure of spermatozoa and then concentrating on collagen. In 1958 he published a study of the structure of protozoa. He set up a new group to use the cilia of protozoa as a model system for the analysis of morphogenesis by correlating the structural and biochemical differences in mutants.

=== Personal life and later years ===
Randall married Doris, daughter of Josiah John Duckworth, a colliery surveyor, in 1928. They had one son, Christopher, born in 1935.

=== Honours and awards ===
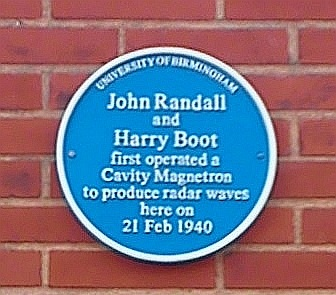
University of Birmingham – Poynting Physics Building – blue plaque

- In 1938, Randall was awarded a Doctor of Science by the Victoria University of Manchester.
- In 1943, he was awarded (with Harry Boot) the Thomas Gray memorial prize of the Royal Society of Arts for the invention of the cavity magnetron.
- In 1945, he was awarded the Duddell Medal and Prize by the Physical Society of London and shared a payment from the Royal Commission on Awards to Inventors for the magnetron invention.
- In 1946, he was elected a Fellow of the Royal Society (FRS) and was awarded their Hughes Medal in the same year
- Further awards (with Boot) for the magnetron work were, in 1958, the John Price Wetherill Medal of the Franklin Institute of the state of Pennsylvania and, in 1959, the John Scott Medal award of the city of Philadelphia.
- In 1962, he was knighted.
