= Maurice Wilkins =

New Zealand-born British biophysicist (1916–2004)

Maurice Wilkins CBE FRS
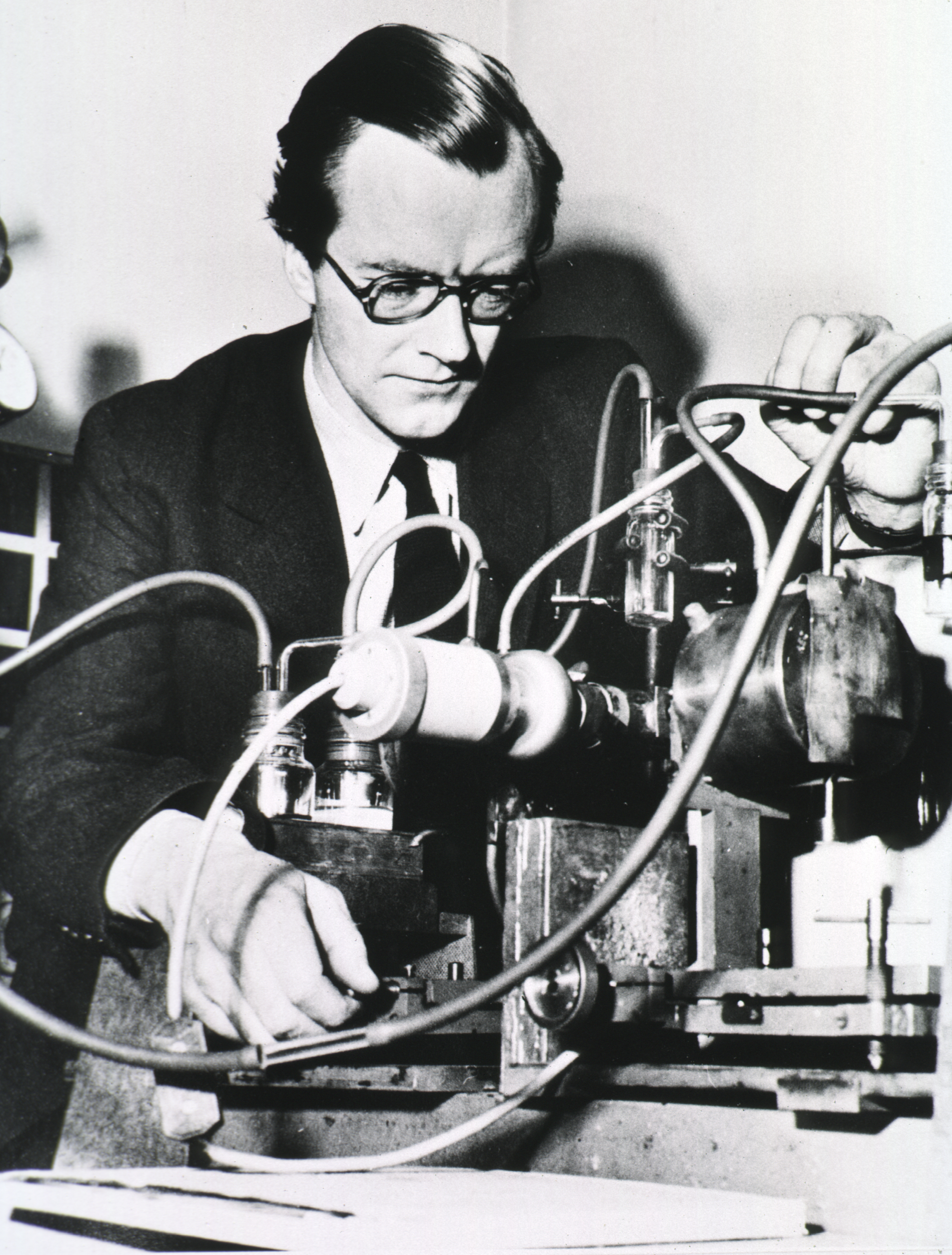
- Maurice Wilkins with one of the cameras he developed specially for X-ray diffraction studies at King's College London
- Born: Maurice Hugh Frederick Wilkins; 15 December 1916; Pongaroa, New Zealand
- Died: 5 October 2004 (aged 87); Blackheath, London, England
- Education: King Edward's School, Birmingham, St John's College, Cambridge (MA); University of Birmingham (PhD)
- Known for: X-ray diffraction, DNA
- Spouses: Ruth Wilkins (divorced) Patricia Ann Chidgey (m. 1959)
- Children: 5
- Relatives: Eithne Wilkins (sister)
- Awards: Lasker Award (1960); Nobel Prize in Physiology or Medicine (1962)
- Scientific career
- Fields: Biophysics; Physics
- Workplaces: King's College London; University of Birmingham; University of California, Berkeley; University of St Andrews
- Thesis: Phosphorescence decay laws and electronic processes in solids (1940)
- Doctoral advisor: John Randall

Maurice Hugh Frederick Wilkins CBE FRS (15 December 1916 – 5 October 2004) was a New Zealand-born British biophysicist and Nobel laureate whose research spanned multiple areas of physics and biophysics, contributing to the scientific understanding of phosphorescence, isotope separation, optical microscopy, and X-ray diffraction. He is most noted for initiating and leading early X-ray diffraction studies on DNA at King's College London, and for his pivotal role in enabling the discovery of the double helix structure of DNA.

Wilkins began investigating nucleic acids in 1948. By 1950, he and his team had produced some of the first high-quality X-ray diffraction images of DNA fibers. The following year, Wilkins presented this work at a conference in Naples, where it significantly influenced James Watson, prompting Watson to pursue DNA structure research with Francis Crick.

In 1951, Rosalind Franklin joined King’s College and was assigned to the same DNA project, though without a clear delineation of leadership. Tensions developed due to overlapping roles and lack of administrative clarity. During this period, Franklin and graduate student Raymond Gosling captured the high-resolution Photo 51, a diffraction image of B-form DNA. In early 1953, John Randall instructed Gosling to hand it over to Wilkins. Wilkins, in turn, showed it to Watson—without Franklin's consent. This action has been the subject of significant ethical and historiographical debate.

Using insights from Photo 51 and prior data—including Wilkins' own diffraction studies—Watson and Crick constructed their double helix model in March 1953. Wilkins simultaneously continued experimental validation, producing confirmatory diffraction images published in the same issue of Nature.

Wilkins' contributions were not limited to verification. He had led the DNA diffraction research at King’s before Franklin’s arrival, initiated the methods that led to Photo 51, and played a central role in sharing data and coordinating the laboratory’s DNA efforts—roles often underrepresented in historical summaries.

In later years, Wilkins extended his studies to RNA structure and worked on the biological effects of radiation. He shared the 1962 Nobel Prize for Physiology or Medicine with Watson and Crick, awarded "for their discoveries concerning the molecular structure of nucleic acids and its significance for information transfer in living material". Although Franklin had died in 1958 and was therefore ineligible, Wilkins acknowledged her work in his writings and interviews.

In 2000, King's College London named one of its science buildings the Franklin-Wilkins Building to honor their contributions; of note, Wilkins had insisted that Franklin's name be put first. Scholarly reassessments in recent decades have increasingly recognized Wilkins’ role as foundational to the DNA discovery effort.

== Early life and education ==
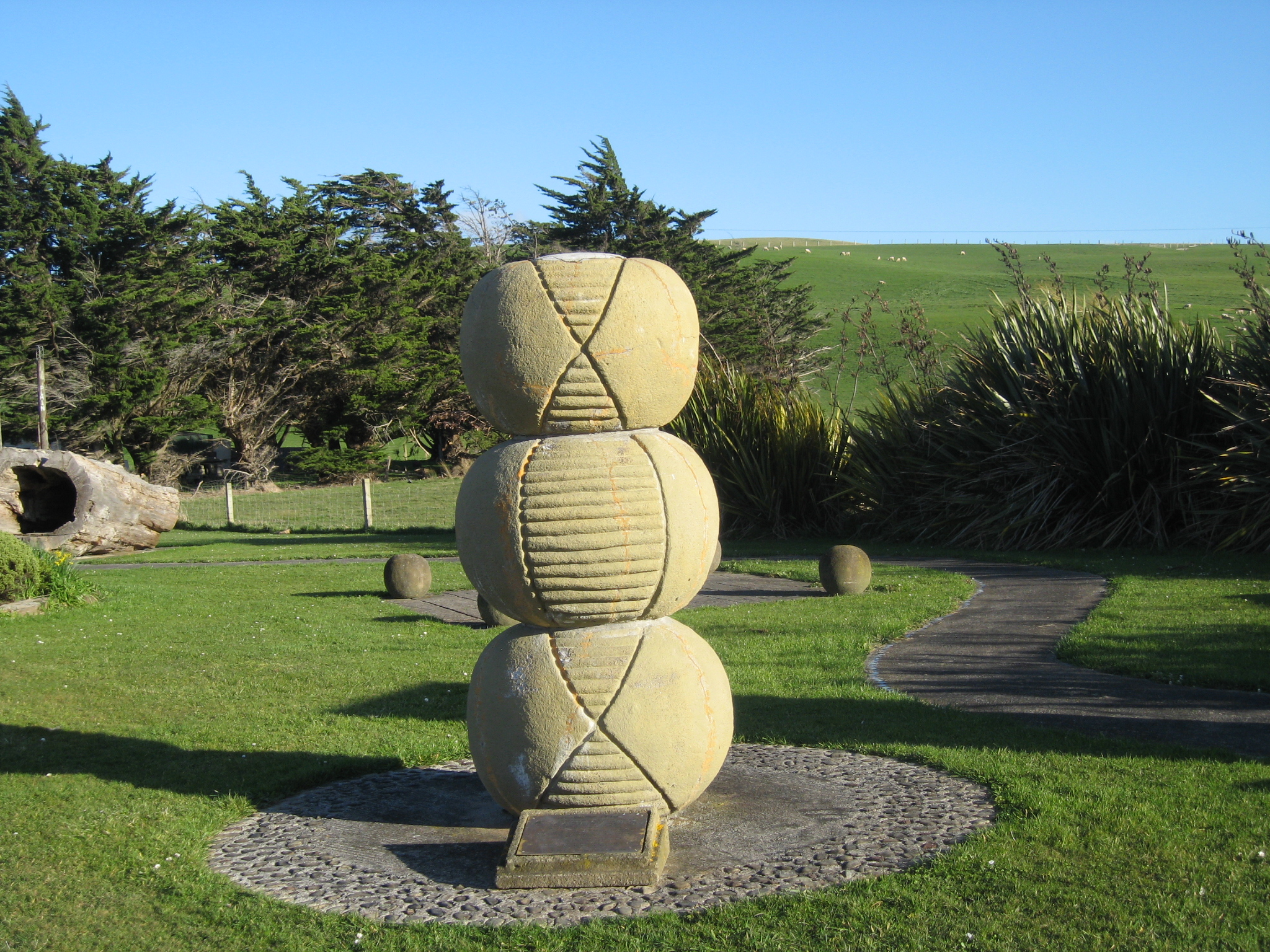
Monument to Maurice Wilkins, Main Street, Pongaroa, New Zealand

Wilkins was born on 15 December 1916 in Pongaroa, New Zealand, where his father, Edgar Henry Wilkins, was a medical doctor. His older sister was the translator and poet Eithne Wilkins. His family had come from Dublin, where his paternal and maternal grandfathers were, respectively, Headmaster of Dublin High School and a Chief of Police. The Wilkinses moved to Birmingham, England when Wilkins was six years old. Later, he attended Wylde Green College and then went to King Edward's School, Birmingham from 1929 to 1935.

Wilkins went to St John's College, Cambridge in 1935; he studied the Natural Sciences Tripos, specialising in Physics, and received a Bachelor of Arts degree three years later. Mark Oliphant, who was one of Wilkins' instructors at St. John's, had been appointed to the Chair of Physics at the University of Birmingham, and had appointed John Randall to his staff. Wilkins became a PhD student of Randall at the University of Birmingham. In 1945, they published four papers in the Proceedings of the Royal Society on phosphorescence and electron traps. Wilkins received a PhD for this work five years prior.

== Career and research ==
=== Post war years: 1945–1950 ===
During World War II, Wilkins developed improved radar screens at Birmingham, then worked on isotope separation at the Manhattan Project at the University of California, Berkeley during the years 1944–45.

Meanwhile, Randall had been appointed to the Chair of Physics at the University of St Andrews. In 1945, he appointed Wilkins as Assistant Lecturer in his department at the University of St Andrews. Randall was negotiating with the Medical Research Council (MRC) to set up a laboratory to apply the experimental methods of physics to problems of biology. The combination of these disciplines as biophysics was a novel idea. The MRC told Randall that this had to be done in another university. In 1946, Randall was appointed Wheatstone Professor of Physics, in charge of the entire Physics department at King's College, London, with the funding to set up a Biophysics Unit. He brought Wilkins with him as Assistant Director of the unit. They appointed a team of scientists trained in both the physical and biological sciences. The "management philosophy" was to explore the use of many techniques in parallel, to find which looked promising, and then to focus on these. Wilkins, as the scientist with most diverse experience of physics and Assistant Director of the unit, had general oversight of the varied projects besides direct involvement in his personal research projects that included new types of optical microscopy. King's College received funding to build completely new Physics and Engineering Departments where vaults beneath the Strand level College forecourt had been destroyed by bombs during the War. The Biophysics Unit, several more experimental physics groups and the theoretical group started to move in, during the early months of 1952. The laboratories were opened formally by Lord Cherwell on 27 June. Wilkins' article for Nature described both departments, consistent with his leadership role and prestige within the college at large.

=== DNA – Phase One ===
At King's College, Wilkins pursued, among other things, X-ray diffraction work on ram sperm and DNA that had been obtained from calf thymus by the Swiss scientist Rudolf Signer. The DNA from Signer's lab was much more intact than the DNA which had previously been isolated. Wilkins discovered that it was possible to produce thin threads from this concentrated DNA solution that contained highly ordered arrays of DNA suitable for the production of X-ray diffraction patterns. Using a carefully bundled group of these DNA threads and keeping them hydrated, Wilkins and a graduate student Raymond Gosling obtained X-ray photographs of DNA that showed that the long, thin DNA molecule in the sample from Signer had a regular, crystal-like structure in these threads. Gosling later said "When... I first saw all those discrete diffraction spots ...emerging on the film in the developing dish was a truly eureka moment....we realised that if DNA was the gene material then we had just shown that genes could crystallize!" This initial X-ray diffraction work at King's College was done in May or June 1950. It was one of the X-ray diffraction photographs taken in 1950, shown at a meeting in Naples a year later, that sparked James Watson's interest in DNA causing him to write "suddenly I was excited about chemistry.....I began to wonder whether it would be possible for me to join Wilkins in working on DNA". At that time, Wilkins also introduced Francis Crick to the importance of DNA. Crick advised him to work on proteins telling Wilkins "what you ought to do is find yourself a good protein". Wilkins knew that proper experiments on the threads of purified DNA would require better X-ray equipment. Wilkins ordered a new X-ray tube and a new microcamera. He also suggested to Randall that the soon-to-be-appointed Rosalind Franklin should be reassigned from work on protein solutions to join the DNA effort.

By the summer of 1950, Randall had arranged for a three-year research fellowship that would fund Rosalind Franklin in his laboratory. Franklin was delayed in finishing her work in Paris. Later that year, Randall wrote to Franklin to inform her that rather than work on protein, she should take advantage of Wilkins's preliminary work and that Franklin should do X-ray studies of DNA fibers made from Signer's samples of DNA.

=== DNA Phase two 1951–52 ===
Early in 1951, Franklin finally arrived. Wilkins was away on holiday and missed an initial meeting at which Raymond Gosling stood in for him along with Alex Stokes, who, like Crick, would solve the basic mathematics that make possible a general theory of how helical structures diffract X-rays. No work had been done on DNA in the laboratory for several months; the new X-ray tube sat unused, waiting for Franklin. Franklin ended up with the DNA from Signer, Gosling became her PhD student, and she had the expectation that DNA X-ray diffraction work was her project. Wilkins returned to the laboratory expecting, on the other hand, that Franklin would be his collaborator and that they would work together on the DNA project that he had started. The confusion over Franklin's and Wilkins' roles in relation to the DNA effort (which later developed into considerable tension between them) is clearly attributable to Randall. In his letter of appointment he told Franklin "as far as the experimental X-ray effort [on DNA] is concerned, there will be at the moment only yourself and Gosling". However, Randall never informed Wilkins of his decision to give Franklin sole responsibility for the DNA effort and Wilkins only learned of the letter years after Franklin's death. He later wrote "My opinion is very clear: that Randall was very wrong to have written to Rosalind telling her that Stokes and I wished to stop our work on DNA, without consulting us. After Raymond [Gosling] and I got a clear crystalline X-ray pattern I was very eager to continue that work ... Trying to understand 'what really happened' when a very admirable scientist [Randall] models himself on Napoleon is not easy ... [but the letter] was very damaging to her and to me".

By November 1951, Wilkins had evidence that DNA in cells as well as purified DNA had a helical structure. Alex Stokes had solved the basic mathematics of helical diffraction theory and thought that Wilkins's X-ray diffraction data indicated a helical structure in DNA. Wilkins met with Watson and Crick and told them about his results. This information from Wilkins, along with additional information gained by Watson when he heard Franklin talk about her research during a King's College research meeting, stimulated Watson and Crick to create their first molecular model of DNA, a model with the phosphate backbones at the center. Upon viewing the model of the proposed structure, Franklin told Watson and Crick that it was wrong. Franklin based this on two observations. First, experiments by J.M. Gulland showed that the CO- and NH_{2} groups of the bases could not be titrated, and so were probably inaccessible. Secondly, crystallographic evidence showed that the structural units of DNA were progressively separated by the addition of water, leading to the formation of a gel and then a solution. Franklin believed that the simplest explanation of this was for the hydrophilic part of the molecule to be on the outside. Crick tried to get Wilkins to continue with additional molecular modeling efforts, but Wilkins did not take this approach.

Early in 1952, Wilkins began a series of experiments on sepia sperm which were very encouraging. "I...got much clearer patterns than the previous year.....when I met [Sir William Lawrence] Bragg by chance I showed him the pattern [which] very clearly offered strong evidence for a helical structure for DNA....the sharp sperm patterns were very inspiring, and had the special interest that sperm were real live objects and not just purified DNA extracted by chemists from living material". Wilkins was particularly interested in whether living samples would yield meaningful X-ray diffraction patterns – his results showed they could.

During 1952, Franklin also refused to participate in molecular modeling efforts and continued to work on step-by-step detailed analysis of her X-ray diffraction data (Patterson synthesis). By the spring of 1952, Franklin had received permission from Randall to ask to transfer her fellowship so that she could leave King's College and work in John Bernal's laboratory at Birkbeck College, also in London. Franklin remained at King's College until the middle of March 1953.

Linus Pauling had published a proposed but incorrect structure of DNA, making the same basic error that Watson and Crick had made a year earlier. Some of those working on DNA in the United Kingdom feared that Pauling would quickly solve the DNA structure once he recognized his error and put the backbones of the nucleotide chains on the outside of a model of DNA. After March 1952, Franklin concentrated on the X-ray data for the A-form of less hydrated DNA while Wilkins tried to work on the hydrated B-form. Wilkins was handicapped because Franklin had all of the good DNA. Wilkins got new DNA samples, but it was not as good as the original sample he had obtained in 1950 and which Franklin continued to use. Most of his new results were for biological samples like sperm cells, which also suggested a helical structure for DNA. In July 1952, Franklin reported to him and Stokes that her newest results made her doubt the helical nature of the A-form.

In early 1953, Watson visited King's College and Wilkins showed him a high quality image of the B-form X-ray diffraction pattern, now identified as photograph 51, that Franklin had produced in May 1952. Wilkins had shown this image produced by Franklin without notifying or receiving authorization from the principal investigator who produced the image. With the knowledge that Pauling was working on DNA and had submitted a model of DNA for publication, Watson and Crick mounted one more concentrated effort to deduce the structure of DNA. Through Max Perutz, his thesis supervisor, Crick gained access to a progress report from King's College that included useful information from Franklin about the features of DNA she had deduced from her X-ray diffraction data. Watson and Crick published their proposed DNA double helical structure in a paper in the journal Nature in April 1953. In this paper Watson and Crick acknowledged that they had been "stimulated by.... the unpublished results and ideas" of Wilkins and Franklin.

The first Watson-Crick paper appeared in Nature on 25 April 1953. The members of the Cambridge and King's College laboratories agreed to report their interlocking work in three papers with continuous pagination in Nature.

Sir Lawrence Bragg, the director of the Cavendish Laboratory, where Watson and Crick worked, gave a talk at Guy's Hospital Medical School in London on Thursday 14 May 1953 which resulted in an article by Ritchie Calder in the News Chronicle of London, on Friday 15 May 1953, entitled "Why You Are You. Nearer Secret of Life." The news reached readers of The New York Times the next day; Victor K. McElheny, in researching his biography of Watson, Watson and DNA: Making a Scientific Revolution, found a clipping of a six-paragraph New York Times article written from London and dated 16 May 1953 with the headline "Form of 'Life Unit' in Cell Is Scanned." The article ran in an early edition and was then pulled to make space for news deemed more important. (The New York Times subsequently ran a longer article on 12 June 1953). The Cambridge University undergraduate newspaper Varsity also ran its own short article on the discovery on Saturday 30 May 1953. Bragg's original announcement at a Solvay conference on proteins in Belgium on 8 April 1953 went unreported by the press.

=== Post-1953 ===
Following the initial 1953 series of publications on the double helix structure of DNA, Wilkins continued research as leader of a team that performed a range of meticulous experiments to establish the helical model as valid among different biological species, as well as in living systems, to establish the universality of the double helix structure. He became deputy director of the MRC Biophysics Unit at King's in 1955, and succeeded Randall as director of the unit from 1970 to 1972.

=== Awards and honours ===
A plaque commemorating Maurice Wilkins and his discovery, beneath the monument, Pongaroa, New Zealand

Wilkins was elected a Fellow of the Royal Society (FRS) in 1959 and an EMBO Member in 1964.

In 1960, Wilkins was presented with the American Public Health Association's Albert Lasker Award. Two years later, he was made a Commander of the Order of the British Empire. Also in 1962, Wilkins shared the Nobel Prize in Physiology or Medicine with Watson and Crick for the discovery of the structure of DNA.

From 1969 to 1991, Wilkins was the founding President of the British Society for Social Responsibility in Science.

In 2000, King's College London opened the Franklin-Wilkins Building in honour of Dr. Franklin's and Professor Wilkins' work at the college.

The wording on the DNA sculpture (donated by James Watson) outside Clare College's Thirkill Court, Cambridge, England is

a) on the base:

i) "These strands unravel during cell reproduction. Genes are encoded in the sequence of bases."
ii) "The double helix model was supported by the work of Rosalind Franklin and Maurice Wilkins."

b) on the helices:

i) "The structure of DNA was discovered in 1953 by Francis Crick and James Watson while Watson lived here at Clare."
ii) "The molecule of DNA has two helical strands that are linked by base pairs Adenine – Thymine or Guanine – Cytosine."

The Centre for Molecular Biodiscovery at the University of Auckland, launched in 2002, was renamed the Maurice Wilkins Centre in 2006.

== Personal life ==
Wilkins was married twice. His first wife, Ruth, was an art student whom he met whilst he was at Berkeley. Their marriage ended in divorce, and Ruth bore her son by Wilkins after their divorce. Wilkins married his second wife, Patricia Ann Chidgey, in 1959. They had four children: Sarah, George, Emily and William. He was survived by his widow Patrica and their children.

In the years before World War II, Wilkins was an anti-war activist, joining the Cambridge Scientists' Anti-War Group. He joined the Communist Party, until the invasion of Poland by the Soviet Army in September 1939. Formerly classified UK security service papers reveal that Wilkins came under suspicion of leaking atomic secrets. The files, released in August 2010, indicate surveillance of Wilkins ended by 1953. "After the war I wondered what I would do, as I was very disgusted with the dropping of two bombs on civilian centres in Japan," he told Britain's Encounter radio program in 1999.

Wilkins published his autobiography, The Third Man of the Double Helix, in 2003.

== Books featuring Maurice Wilkins ==
- Maurice Wilkins, The Third Man of the Double Helix: The Autobiography of Maurice Wilkins. Oxford University Press, 2003 (ISBN 0-19-860665-6)
- Robert Olby; "Wilkins, Maurice Hugh Frederick (1916–2004)", Oxford Dictionary of National Biography, online edn, Oxford University Press, Jan 2008
- Robert Olby; "Francis Crick: Hunter of Life's Secrets", Cold Spring Harbor Laboratory Press, ISBN 978-0-87969-798-3, published in August 2009.
- John Finch; A Nobel Fellow on Every Floor, Medical Research Council 2008, 381 pp, ISBN 978-1-84046-940-0; this book is all about the MRC Laboratory of Molecular Biology, Cambridge
- Robert Olby; The Path to The Double Helix: Discovery of DNA; first published in October 1974 by MacMillan, with foreword by Francis Crick; ISBN 0-486-68117-3; the definitive DNA textbook, revised in 1994, with a 9-page postscript.
- Horace Freeland Judson, The Eighth Day of Creation. Makers of the Revolution in Biology; CSHL Press 1996 ISBN 0-87969-478-5.
- Watson, James D. The Double Helix: A Personal Account of the Discovery of the Structure of DNA; The Norton Critical Edition, which was published in 1980, edited by Gunther S. Stent:ISBN 0-393-01245-X.
- Chomet, S. (Ed.), D.N.A. Genesis of a Discovery, 1994, Newman- Hemisphere Press, London; NB a few copies are available from Newman-Hemisphere at 101 Swan Court, London SW3 5RY.
- Maddox, Brenda, Rosalind Franklin: The Dark Lady of DNA, 2002. ISBN 0-06-018407-8.
- Sayre, Anne 1975. Rosalind Franklin and DNA. New York: W.W. Norton and Company. ISBN 0-393-32044-8.
- Crick, Francis, 1990. What Mad Pursuit: A Personal View of Scientific Discovery (Basic Books reprint edition) ISBN 0-465-09138-5
- Watson, James D., The Double Helix: A Personal Account of the Discovery of the Structure of DNA, Atheneum, 1980, ISBN 0-689-70602-2 (first published in 1968)
- Krude, Torsten (Ed.) DNA Changing Science and Society: The Darwin Lectures for 2003 CUP 2003, includes a lecture by Sir Aaron Klug on Rosalind Franklin's involvement in the determination of the structure of DNA.
- Ridley, Matt; Francis Crick: Discoverer of the Genetic Code was first published in June 2006 in the US and then in the UK September 2006, by HarperCollins Publishers; 192 pp, ISBN 0-06-082333-X; this short book is in the publisher's Eminent Lives series.
- Light Is A Messenger, the life and science of William Lawrence Bragg by Graeme Hunter, ISBN 0-19-852921-X; Oxford University Press, 2004.
- Designs For Life: Molecular Biology After World War II by Soraya de Chadarevian; CUP 2002, 444 pp; ISBN 0-521-57078-6; it includes James Watson's "well kept open secret" from April 2003!
- Tait, Sylvia & James Francis Tait. A Quartet of Unlikely Discoveries (Athena Press 2004) ISBN 1-84401-343-X
- James D. Watson, The Annotated and Illustrated Double Helix, edited by Alexander Gann and Jan Witkowski (2012) Simon & Schuster, ISBN 978-1-4767-1549-0.
