= Alec Stokes =

British physicist

- Born: Alexander Rawson Stokes; 27 June 1919; Macclesfield, England
- Died: 5 February 2003 (aged 83)
- Education: University of Cambridge
- Known for: Molecular structure of DNA
- Spouse: Margaret Stokes
- Children: 2 sons and 1 daughter
- Scientific career
- Fields: Physics, biophysics
- Workplaces: Royal Holloway College, London; King's College London
- Thesis: Imperfect Crystals (1944)
- Doctoral advisor: Lawrence Bragg
- Other academic advisors: John Randall

Alexander Rawson Stokes (27 June 1919 – 6 February 2003) was a British physicist at Royal Holloway College, London and later at King's College London. He was most recognised as a co-author of the second of the three papers published sequentially in Nature on 25 April 1953 describing the correct molecular structure of DNA. The first was authored by Francis Crick and James Watson, and the third by Rosalind Franklin and Raymond Gosling.

In 1993, on the 40th anniversary of the publication of the molecular structure of DNA, a plaque was erected in the Quad (courtyard) of the Strand campus of King's College London, commemorating the contributions of Franklin, Gosling, Stokes, Wilson, and Wilkins to "DNA X-ray diffraction studies".

== Early life and education ==
Known by the name Alec, Stokes was born in Macclesfield, Cheshire. He studied at Cheadle Hulme School in Manchester. He received a first-class degree in the natural science tripos in 1940 at Trinity College, Cambridge and then researched X-ray crystallography of Imperfect Crystals for his PhD in 1943 under the supervision of Lawrence Bragg at the Cavendish Laboratory.

== Scientific work ==
Stokes lectured in physics at Royal Holloway College, London before joining John Randall's Biophysics Research Unit at King's College London in 1947. He has been credited as being the first person to demonstrate that the DNA molecule was probably helical in shape. Maurice Wilkins wrote in his autobiography that he asked Stokes to predict what a helical structure would look like as an x-ray diffraction photograph, and that he was able to determine this by the next day through mathematical calculations made during a short train journey. Stokes continued to work on optical diffraction in large biological molecules. His publications include the books The Theory of the Optical Properties of Inhomogeneous Materials. London: E. and F.N. Spon Ltd, (1963) and The Principles of Atomic and Nuclear Physics C.J. Smith and A.R. Stokes, London, Edward Arnold, (1972) ISBN 0-7131-2313-3.

== Later life ==
Stokes retired from King's College London as a senior lecturer in 1982. He was a choral singer, played the piano and was an elder in his local free church, in Welwyn Garden City. He died on 5 February 2003, survived by his wife, Margaret, two sons, Gordon Stokes and Ian Stokes and a daughter, Jean Stokes.
