= Raymond Gosling =

British physicist (1926–2015)

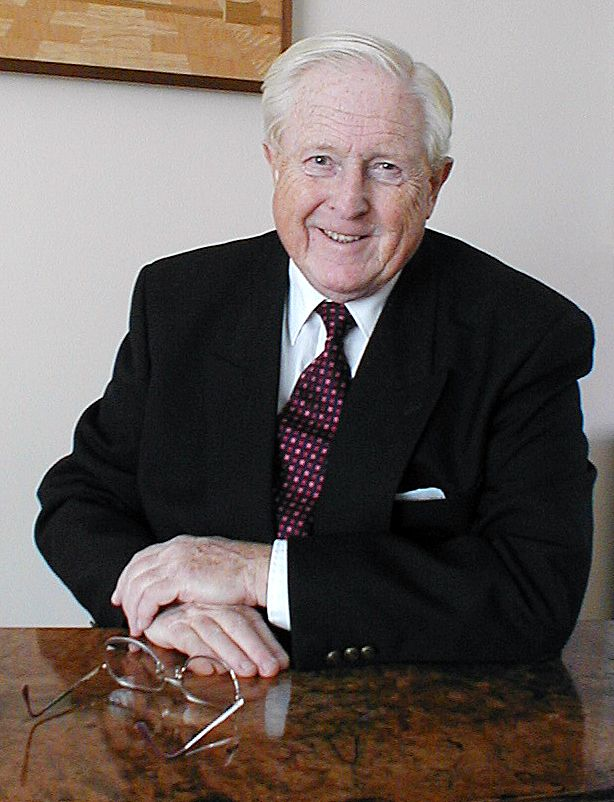
- Gosling in 2003
- Born: 15 July 1926; Wembley, London, England
- Died: 18 May 2015 (aged 88)
- Education: University College London; King's College London (PhD)
- Known for: DNA
- Scientific career
- Fields: Physics
- Workplaces: King's College London
- Thesis: X-ray diffraction studies of Deoxyribose Nucleic Acid (1954)
- Doctoral advisor: Maurice Wilkins, Rosalind Franklin

Raymond George Gosling (15 July 1926 – 18 May 2015) was a British scientist. While a PhD student at King's College, London he worked under the supervision of Maurice Wilkins and Rosalind Franklin. The crystallographic experiments of Franklin and Gosling, together with others by Wilkins, produced data that helped James Watson and Francis Crick to infer the structure of DNA.

== Early years ==
He was born in 1926 and attended school in Wembley. He studied physics at University College London from 1944 to 1947 and became a hospital physicist at the King's Fund and Middlesex Hospital between 1947 and 1949 before joining King's College London as a research student, from which he eventually received his PhD.

== Career ==
=== Work at King's College London and DNA ===
When he arrived at King's College London, Gosling was directed by Sir John Randall to work on the problem of the structure of DNA. Randall was convinced that DNA was the material which transmitted the genetic code. Randall assigned him to work on X-ray diffraction with Maurice Wilkins, analysing samples of DNA which they prepared by hydrating and drawing out into thin filaments and photographing in a hydrogen atmosphere. He made the first x-ray diffraction image of crystallized DNA. His comment on this discovery was "I must be the first person ever to make genes crystallize", although he was probably unaware of the prior work of Florence Bell.

After the initial work producing the first x-ray diffraction of DNA, Randall reassigned Gosling to work with Rosalind Franklin, who had been just hired to join King's College in 1951. He did this without consulting with Wilkins, a factor which may have contributed to the animosity between the two.

During the next two years, the pair worked closely together to perfect the technique of X-ray diffraction photography of DNA and obtained at the time the sharpest diffraction images of DNA. They produced the first X-ray diffraction photographs of the "wet form B" (B-DNA) paracrystalline arrays of highly hydrated DNA. In 1952, Gosling made the best X-ray diffraction image of DNA known as Photo 51. This piece of evidence helped Francis Crick and James D. Watson to decipher the correct chemical structure. Crick, Watson and Wilkins shared the 1962 Nobel Prize for Physiology or Medicine on discoveries of nucleic acid structure. Gosling was the co-author with Franklin of one of the three DNA double helix papers published in Nature in April 1953. Gosling was not recognized by the Nobel Committee and Franklin had died four years before.

When Franklin left King's College, Gosling was reassigned back to work with Wilkins, with whom he formally completed his thesis work. After the first Nature article on the x-ray diffraction results leading to the double helix model, he and Franklin (who had by that time left King's College) followed up their DNA x-ray analysis with a second article in Nature.

His other King's colleagues included Alex Stokes and Herbert Wilson.

=== Work following Kings College ===
Gosling briefly remained at King's College following the completion of his thesis in 1954, but the 1953 work on DNA structure was not, at the time, viewed with the importance it now has achieved, and following his Ph.D., Gosling found no opportunity to continue at King's, although he would have liked to do so.

Gosling went on to lecture in physics at Queen's College, University of St Andrews in Scotland, and then found a long-term position at the University of the West Indies. For a few years he continued with crystallography research, focusing on analysis of the structure of nucleotides, but then shifted toward research in the field of medical physics, working on designing equipment to study and diagnose atherosclerosis.

=== Work at Guy's Hospital ===
He returned to the UK in 1967 and became lecturer and reader at Guy's Hospital Medical School, and professor and emeritus professor in physics applied to medicine from 1984. Here he helped develop the underlying basic medical science and technology for haemodynamic doppler ultrasound vascular assessment in the Non Invasive Angiology Group, and set up the clinical Ultrasonic Angiology Unit.

Gosling served on numerous committees of the University of London, notably relating to radiological science, and retained an active professional involvement in medical physics almost to the end of his life.

== Personal background ==
Gosling and his wife Mary had four sons, the eldest of whom is the furniture designer Tim Gosling. Raymond Gosling died at the age of 88 on 18 May 2015.
