= Alexander Dounce =

American professor of biochemistry (1909–1997)

Alexander L. Dounce
- Alexander Dounce, ca. 1947–1950
- Born: December 7, 1909; New York, United States
- Died: April 24, 1997 (aged 87); Rochester, New York, United States
- Education: Hamilton College, Cornell University
- Known for: Dounce homogenizer; co-discovery of catalase crystallization
- Spouse: Anna Elizabeth Dounce
- Scientific career
- Fields: Organic chemistry, biochemistry
- Workplaces: Cornell University (1936–1941), University of Rochester (1941–retirement),
- Thesis: Study of dihydrofurans and the dehydration rearrangement of 2,3-ethylenic 1,4-diols. (1935)
- Doctoral advisor: James B. Sumner

Alexander Latham Dounce (December 7, 1909 – April 24, 1997) was an American professor of biochemistry. Among his fields of study were the isolation and purification of cellular organelles, protein crystallization, enzymes (specifically catalase), DNA binding proteins, and the chemical basis of protein synthesis. He also invented the Dounce homogenizer, which was named after him.

== Biography ==
Alexander Dounce was born on December 7, 1909, in New York. He began his undergraduate studies at Hamilton College but later moved to Cornell University, where he also did his doctoral studies in the lab of James B. Sumner, a pioneer in protein crystallization. Dounce received his PhD in organic chemistry in 1935, the title of his thesis being "Study of dihydrofurans and the dehydration rearrangement of 2,3-ethylenic 1,4-diols". According to Marshall W. Nirenberg, another biochemist who knew Dounce personally, "during his [Dounce's] final doctoral exam when his doctoral committee got together to ask him questions after he had finished his thesis research, his mentor, Sumner, asked him the question, 'How do proteins synthesize other proteins?' He [Dounce] said that question remained in his mind ever since then."

After his graduation, Dounce stayed in Sumners lab and did work on enzymes, particularly on enzyme isolation and purification. Together with Sumner, he achieved the first crystallization of the enzyme catalase in 1937. In 1941, Dounce moved to the Department of Biochemistry at University of Rochester Medical School, where he worked on the mechanism of uranium poisoning for the Manhattan Project. After the end of World War II, he focussed on studying cell nuclei and particularly the isolation of intact nuclei from tissue, which was a new field of research at the time. In 1952, Alexander Dounce and Ernest Kay, who was Dounce's first PhD student, published a new method for DNA isolation and purification from nuclei employing sodium dodecyl sulfate that became widely used.

Also in 1952, Dounce wrote a review article in which he, as one of the first scientists to do so, proposed that DNA might serve as a template for the synthesis of RNA, which in turn serves as a template for the synthesis of proteins. This order of synthesis, which has later been termed the "central dogma of molecular biology" by Francis Crick, is textbook knowledge today. However, it was not until 1958, when Crick coined the term central dogma and described the concept in more detail, that it gained widespread acceptance.

In the same review article, Dounce was also one of the first scientists to propose a genetic code in which nucleotide triplets code for each of the 20 proteinogenic amino acids. He correctly assumed that genes consist of nucleic acid sequences which determine the amino acid sequences of proteins, and that a protein's sequence determines its function. Based on these assumptions, Dounce speculated that, during protein synthesis, each amino acid would pair with an individual nucleotide; the two other nucleotides surrounding it would determine the specificity of the binding. While the actual mechanism turned out to be different, Dounce's hypothesis that nucleotide triplets code for amino acids was correct, and his speculations "helped lead to the deciphering of the code." In the words of Nirenberg, "In the review he was far ahead of everybody else [...]. He predicted that the code would be a triplet code, and that, as I recall, RNA was the template for protein synthesis. But he buried this article in the proceedings of an Oak Ridge symposium that nobody read. [...] By and large, the ideas were good, although he was wrong on minutiae. I was amazed when I finally read it." When James D. Watson and George Gamow founded the RNA Tie Club in 1954, Dounce became one of its members; his designation was GLN (glutamine).

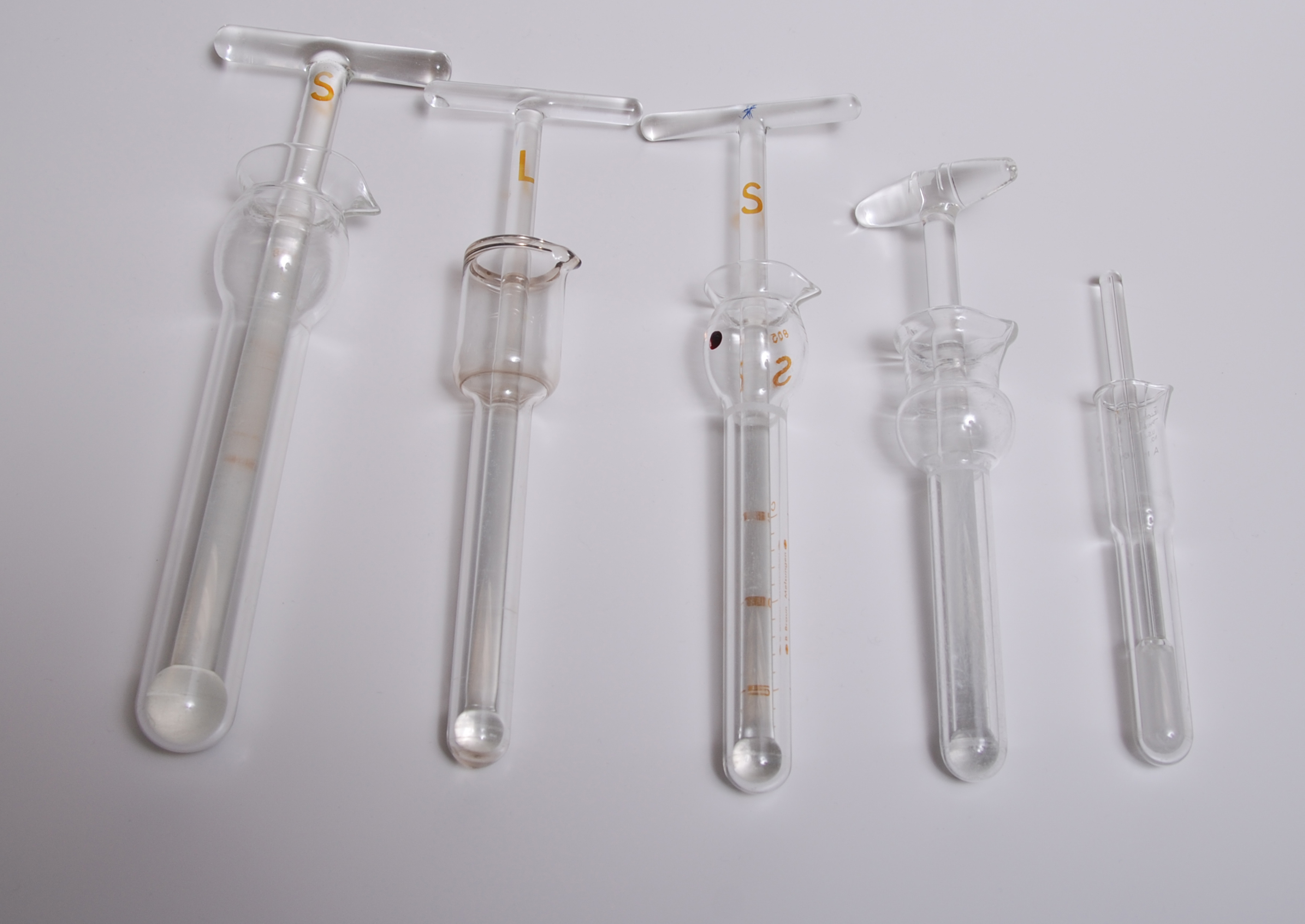
The Dounce homogenizers, devices used for mechanical lysis of tissue or cells, were invented by and named after Alexander Dounce.

Dounce's work on the isolation of cellular organelles, particularly nuclei and mitochondria, led to the development of the Dounce homogenizers in 1954. A Dounce homogenizer or "Douncer" is a glass mortar and pestle with a very small clearance between the mortar and the pestle – in Dounce's original design as little as 0.0005 inches or about 13 micrometers. This allows for tissue and cells to be lysed by shear stress while leaving the smaller organelles intact. Dounce homogenizers are still commonly used today to isolate cellular organelles.

When Dounce's former mentor, James B. Sumner, died in 1955, Dounce wrote Sumner's obituary in Nature.

For the remainder of his career, Dounce continued his research on nuclei and their contents, catalase, and protein crystallization.

Dounce died on April 24, 1997, in Rochester, New York. He was survived by his wife, Anna Elizabeth Dounce, who was the daughter of botanist Donald Reddick, and by their three children Helen, Eric, and George.

== Scientific publications ==
=== Key publications ===
- Dounce, A. L. (September 1935). Study of dihydrofurans and the dehydration rearrangement of 2,3-ethylenic 1,4-diols. Ithaca, New York. LCCN 36016046. OCLC 63223210. Dounce's PhD thesis
- Sumner, J. B.; Dounce, A. L. (1937). "Crystalline Catalase". Science. 85 (2206): 366–367. Bibcode:1937Sci....85..366S. doi:10.1126/science.85.2206.366. PMID 17776781. Description of the first crystallization of catalase
- Kay, E. R. M.; Simmons, N. S.; Dounce, A. L. (1952). "An improved preparation of sodium desoxyribonucleate". Journal of the American Chemical Society. 74 (7): 1724. Bibcode:1952JAChS..74.1724K. doi:10.1021/ja01127a034. An often-cited method for DNA isolation and purification
- Dounce, A. L. (September 1952). "Duplicating mechanism for peptide chain and nucleic acid synthesis". Enzymologia. 15 (5): 251–258. ISSN 0013-9424. OCLC 102534469. PMID 13033864. Dounce's speculative review on the mechanism of protein and nucleic acid synthesis
- Dounce, A. L. (1955). "The Isolation and Composition of Cell Nuclei and Nucleoli" (PDF, 35.3 MB). In Chargaff, Erwin; Davidson, J.N. (eds.). The Nucleic Acids: Chemistry and Biology, Volume II. New York: Academic Press. pp. 93–153. doi:10.5962/bhl.title.6974. LCCN 54011055. First detailed description of the Dounce homogenizers

=== Further publications ===
Complete list of PubMed-listed articles by Dounce
