= What mad pursuit =

What mad pursuit may refer to:

- What Mad Pursuit: A Personal View of Scientific Discovery, a 1988 autobiography of Francis Crick
- The first question on the ninth line of Keats' poem Ode on a Grecian Urn
- What Mad Pursuit, a 2013 documentary by Rob Nilsson
- What Mad Pursuit, a 1934 book by Martha Gellhorn
- "What Mad Pursuit", a short story by Noël Coward
