= The Astonishing Hypothesis =

Book by Francis Crick

The Astonishing Hypothesis: The Scientific Search for the Soul
- Cover of the original edition
- Author: Francis Crick
- Publisher: Simon & Schuster
- Publication date: October 1994
- ISBN: 9780684801582

The Astonishing Hypothesis is a 1994 book by scientist Francis Crick about consciousness. Crick, one of the co-discoverers of the molecular structure of DNA, later became a theorist for neurobiology and the study of the brain. The Astonishing Hypothesis is mostly concerned with establishing a basis for scientific study of consciousness; however, Crick places the study of consciousness within a larger social context. Human consciousness according to Crick is central to human existence and so scientists find themselves approaching topics traditionally left to philosophy and religion.

== Synopsis ==
The Astonishing Hypothesis posits that "a person's mental activities are entirely due to the behavior of nerve cells, glial cells, and the atoms, ions, and molecules that make them up and influence them." Crick claims that scientific study of the brain during the 20th century led to acceptance of consciousness, free will, and the human soul as subjects for scientific investigation.

Rather than attempting to cover all the aspects of consciousness (self-awareness, thought, imagination, perception, etc.), Crick focuses on the primate visual system and breaks down the prerequisites for conscious experience into several broad subconditions, including some sort of short-term memory and attention mechanism. The book then delves into a brief overview of many neuroscientific topics, ranging from a survey of how neurons function to a description of basic neural circuits and their artificial equivalents. Throughout, Crick cites various experiments which illustrate the points he is making about visual awareness, such as studies investigating the phenomenon of blindsight in macaques.

The later chapters of the book synthesize many of the points made earlier about the visual system into a unified framework, although Crick recognises exceptions to his proposed framework. Also, here he takes the opportunity to make suggestions for further experiments that could provide empirical basis for further understanding about human consciousness and includes a brief addendum on several topics he glossed over, like free will. Overall, the message Crick repeats as the main purpose of writing the Astonishing Hypothesis is to break the scientific community's reluctance to give consciousness a thorough and scientifically grounded investigation, and to encourage others such as philosophers to address the issues of consciousness in a way that takes account of neuroscientific discoveries.

== Background and response ==
Crick had discussed the relationship between science and religion in his earlier book What Mad Pursuit. Crick's view of this relationship was that religions can be wrong about scientific matters and that part of what science does is to confront the errors that exist within religious traditions. For example, the idea of a mechanism for the evolution of life by natural selection conflicts with some views on creation of life by divine intervention. Crick's subtitle for The Astonishing Hypothesis is The Scientific Search for the Soul.

== Criticism ==
Some have criticized the book's main conceit from different angles. Neurologist and Nobel Laureate Gerald Edelman believes that neural Darwinism is a more satisfactory explanation for the emergence of complex intelligence in humans. Another school of thought, this one largely made up of those outside of scientific disciplines, consider consciousness to either be simply beyond the possibility of explanation or at least dependent on some qualities that are not simply physical (i.e. molecules, etc.). There are also a few fringe theorists who support a quantum theory of mind and also disagree that the brain's function reduces to only classical physics.

== See also ==
- Consciousness–matter dualism
- China Brain
- Epiphenomenalism
- Physicalism
