= RNA Tie Club =

Association of scientists deciphering the genetic code

The RNA Tie Club was an informal scientific club, meant partly to be humorous, of select scientists who were interested in how proteins were synthesised from genes, specifically the genetic code. It was created by George Gamow upon a suggestion by James Watson in 1954 when the relationship between nucleic acids and amino acids in genetic information was unknown. The club consisted of 20 full members, each representing an amino acid, and four honorary members, representing the four nucleotides. The function of the club members was to think up possible solutions and share with the other members.

The first important document of the RNA Tie Club was Francis Crick's adaptor hypothesis in 1955. Experimental work on the hypothesis led to the discovery of transfer RNA, a molecule that carries the key to genetic code. Most of the theoretical groundwork and preliminary experiments on the genetic code were done by the club members within a decade. However, the specific code was discovered by Marshall Nirenberg, a non-member, who received the Nobel Prize in Physiology or Medicine in 1968 for the discovery.

== History ==
=== Background ===
In 1953, English biophysicist Francis Crick and American biologist James Watson, working together at the Cavendish Laboratory of the University of Cambridge, deduced the structure of DNA, the principal genetic material of organisms, thought to link genetic information in DNA to proteins. By 1954, it was becoming understood that the genetic information pathway involved DNA, RNA and proteins. However, the structure and nature of RNA were still a mystery (specific RNA molecules were not known until 1960), especially how RNA is involved in protein synthesis. Watson called this problem "the mystery of life" in his letter to Crick.

Soviet-American physicist George Gamow at George Washington University suggested the first scheme for protein synthesis from DNA. In early 1954, he spent several days at Woods Hole on Cape Cod with Crick, Watson and Sydney Brenner, discussing genetics. Based on the Watson-Crick model, he proposed a "direct DNA template hypothesis" stating that proteins are synthesised directly from the double-stranded grooves of DNA. The four bases of DNA were assumed to synthesise 20 different amino acids as triplets with overlapping nucleotide sequences. He published the hypothesis in the 13 February 1954 issue of Nature, explaining:

It seems to me that such translation procedure can be easily established by considering the 'key-and-lock' relation between various amino-acids, and the rhomb-shaped 'holes' formed by various nucleotides in the deoxyribonucleic acid chain... One can speculate that free amino-acids from the surrounding medium get caught into the 'holes' of deoxyribonucleic acid molecules, and thus unite into the corresponding peptide chains.

=== Foundation ===
In May 1954, Watson visited Gamow, who was on sabbatical at the University of California, Berkeley. While discussing Gamow's hypothesis, he suggested that they form a 20-member club to work out the genetic code. Gamow instantly came up with the RNA Tie Club to "solve the riddle of the RNA structure and to understand how it built proteins", adding the motto "do or die; or don't try."

The club thus consisted of 20 eminent scientists, each of whom corresponded to an amino acid, plus four honorary members (S. Brenner, VAL. F. Lipmann, A. Szent-Gyorgyi, and another individual), one for each nucleotide.

Each member received a woolen necktie having an embroidered helix, hence the name "RNA Tie Club".

== Members ==
Member	Training	RNA Tie Club Designation	Officer designation
George Gamow	Physicist	ALA	Synthesizer
Alexander Rich	Biochemist	ARG	Lord Privy Seal of the British Cabinet
Paul Doty	Physical Chemist	ASP	
Robert Ledley	Mathematical Biophysicist	ASN	
Martynas Ycas	Biochemist	CYS	Archivist
Robley Williams	Electron Microscopist	GLU	
Alexander Dounce	Biochemist	GLN	
Richard Feynman	Theoretical Physicist	GLY	
Melvin Calvin	Chemist	HIS	
Norman Simmons	Biochemist	ILE	
Edward Teller	Physicist	LEU	
Erwin Chargaff	Biochemist	LYS	
Nicholas Metropolis	Physicist, Mathematician	MET	
Gunther Stent	Physical Chemist	PHE	
James Watson	Biologist	PRO	Optimist
Harold Gordon	Biologist	SER	
Leslie Orgel	Theoretical Chemist	THR	
Max Delbrück	Theoretical Physicist	TRP	
Francis Crick	Physicist	TYR	Pessimist
Sydney Brenner	Biologist	VAL	

== The tie and tiepin ==
Members of the RNA Tie Club received a black wool-knit tie with a green and yellow RNA helix emblazoned on it. The original design of the tie came from Orgel, with the final pattern re-imagined by Gamow. Gamow's tie pattern was delivered to a Los Angeles haberdasher on Colorado Avenue by Watson, with the shop tailor promising to make the ties for $4 each. Along with each tie, members of the club were to receive a golden tiepin with the three letter abbreviation of their club amino acid designation. Not all members may have received their pin. Gamow, however, wore his pin on several occasions, often causing confusion and questioning of why he was wearing the "wrong initials".

== Successes ==
The RNA Tie Club never had a formal meeting of all its members. Members visited each other to discuss the scientific developments, usually involving cigars and alcohol. This allowed bonding and close friendships to develop among this scientific elite, and it turned out to be a breeding ground for creative ideas. The members mailed letters and preprints of articles to each other suggesting new concepts and ideas.

=== Number of nucleotides in a codon ===
Using mathematics, Gamow postulated that a nucleotide code consisting of three letters (triplets) would be enough to define all 20 amino acids. This concept is the basis of "codons", and set an upper and lower limit on their size. Gamow had simply estimated that the number of bases and their complementary pairs in a DNA strand could create 20 cavities for amino acids, meaning that 20 different amino acids could be involved in protein synthesis. He named this DNA–protein interaction the "diamond code." Although Gamow's premise that DNA directly synthesized proteins was proven wrong, the triplet code became the foundation of genetic code.

=== Codons ===
Sydney Brenner proposed the concept of the codon, the idea that three non-overlapping nucleotides could code for one amino acid. His proof involved statistics and experimental evidence from amino acid protein sequences.

=== Adaptor hypothesis ===
Francis Crick proposed the "adaptor hypothesis" (a name given by Brenner) suggesting that some molecule ferried the amino acids around, and put them in the correct order corresponding to the nucleic acid sequence. The hypothesis contradicted Gamow's direct DNA template hypothesis, positing that DNA could not synthesise proteins directly, but instead requires other molecules, adaptors to convert the DNA sequences to amino acid sequences. He also suggested that there were such 20 separate adaptor molecules. This was later confirmed by Robert Holley and the adaptor molecules were named transfer RNAs (tRNAs).

The typed paper distributed to the members of the RNA Tie Club in January 1955 as "On Degenerate Templates and the Adaptor Hypothesis: A Note for the RNA Tie Club" is described as "one of the most important unpublished articles in the history of science", and "the most famous unpublished paper in the annals of molecular biology." Watson recalled, "The most famous of these [unpublished] notes, by Francis, in time would totally change the way we thought about protein synthesis.

=== Personal successes ===
Six members of the RNA Tie Club became Nobel laureates: Richard Feynman, Melvin Calvin, James Watson, Max Delbruck, Francis Crick and Sydney Brenner. However, the ultimate goal of understanding and deciphering the code linking nucleic acids and amino acids was achieved by Marshall Nirenberg, who was not a member of the RNA Tie Club, and received the Nobel Prize in Physiology or Medicine in 1968 with Holley and Har Gobind Khorana.
