= Alexander Rich =

American biologist (1924–2015)

- Born: 15 November 1924; Hartford, Connecticut, U.S.
- Died: 27 April 2015 (aged 90); Boston, Massachusetts, U.S.
- Education: Harvard University
- Known for: discovery of polysomes and Z-DNA
- Awards: National Medal of Science; William Procter Prize for Scientific Achievement; Welch Award in Chemistry; Lomonosov Gold Medal
- Scientific career
- Fields: Biophysics
- Workplaces: Massachusetts Institute of Technology

Alexander Rich (15 November 1924 – 27 April 2015) was an American biologist and biophysicist. He was the William Thompson Sedgwick Professor of Biophysics at the Massachusetts Institute of Technology (since 1958) and Harvard Medical School. Rich earned an A.B. (magna cum laude) and an M.D. (cum laude) from Harvard University. He was a post-doc of Linus Pauling. During this time he was a member of the RNA Tie Club, a social and discussion group which attacked the question of how DNA encodes proteins. He has over 600 publications to his name.

Born in Hartford, Connecticut, Rich was the founder of Alkermes and was a director beginning in 1987. Rich was co-chairman of the board of directors of Repligen, a biopharmaceutical company. He also served on the editorial board of Genomics and the Journal of Biomolecular Structure and Dynamics.

== Personal life ==
Rich spent his early life in Springfield, Massachusetts. He grew up in a working-class family and worked in the U.S. Armory while he was in high school. From 1943 to 1946, Rich was in the U.S. Navy.

He obtained a bachelor's in biochemical sciences from Harvard University in 1947 and a medical degree from Harvard Medical School in 1949. Rich died on 27 April 2015, aged 90.

== Academic career ==
At Harvard, Rich studied with John Edsall, who inspired him to pursue an academic career. In 1949, he moved to the California Institute of Technology to perform postdoctoral research with Linus Pauling. He met James Watson during his time in Pauling's lab. He stayed in Pauling's group until 1954. Rich worked as a section chief in physical chemistry at the National Institutes of Health from 1954 to 1958. He spent a sabbatical at the Cavendish Laboratory in Cambridge (1955–1956), where he worked with Francis Crick and solved the structure of collagen. He became a professor at MIT in 1958. He worked diligently at MIT until his death in 2015. He still went into lab until two months before his death.

== Contributions to science ==
His work played a pivotal role in the discovery of nucleic acid hybridization.

In 1955, Rich and Crick solved the structure of collagen.

In 1963, Rich discovered polysomes: clusters of ribosomes which read one strand of mRNA simultaneously.

From 1969 to 1980, he was a biology investigator looking for life on mars with NASA's Viking Mission to Mars.

In 1973, Rich's lab determined the structure of tRNA.

In 1979, Rich and co-workers at MIT grew a crystal of Z-DNA. After 26 years of attempts, Rich et al. finally crystallised the junction box of B- and Z-DNA. Their results were published in an October 2005 Nature journal. Whenever Z-DNA forms, there must be two junction boxes that allow the flip back to the canonical B-form of DNA.

== List of awards and prizes received ==
- a member of the National Academy of Sciences (appointed 17 April 1978)
- a member of the American Academy of Arts and Sciences
- a member of the Philosophical Society
- a member of the French Academy of Sciences
- a member of the Institute of Medicine
- a member of the Scientific Advisory Board of U.S. Genomics, Inc.
- President Bill Clinton recognized his outstanding scientific achievements with the National Medal of Science in 1995.
- The Bower Award and Prize for Achievement in Science (2000)
- 2001 William Procter Prize for Scientific Achievement
- 2008 Welch Award in Chemistry: "For outstanding contributions to the understanding of the chemical and biochemical mechanisms in maintaining a living cell".

=== Awards and prizes ===
- Sigma Xi Proctor Prize, Raleigh, NC (2001)
- Bower Award and Prize, the Franklin Institute, Philadelphia, PA (2000)
- National Medal of Science, Washington, DC (1995)
- Linus Pauling Medal, American Chemical Society, Northwest Sections (1995)
- Lewis S. Rosenstiel Award in Basic Biomedical Research, Brandeis Univ., Waltham, MA (1983)
- James R. Killian Faculty Achievement Award, Massachusetts Institute of Technology (1980)
- Presidential Award, New York Academy of Science, New York, NY (1977)
- Theodore van Karmen Award for Viking Mars Mission, Washington, DC (1976)
- Skylab Achievement Award, National Aeronautics and Space Administration, Washington, DC (1974)

=== Academies ===
- Foreign Member, Russian Academy of Sciences, Moscow, Russia (1994)
- Honorary Member, Japanese Biochemical Society, Tokyo, Japan (1986)
- Foreign Member, French Academy of Sciences, Paris, France (1984)
- Honorary Doctorate, Federal University of Rio de Janeiro, Brazil (1981)
- American Philosophical Society, Philadelphia, PA (1980)
- Pontifical Academy of Sciences (1978)
- National Academy of Sciences, Washington, DC (1970)
- Fellow, American Association for the Advancement of Science, Washington, DC (1965)
- Fellow, Guggenheim Foundation (1963)
- Fellow, American Academy of Arts and Sciences, Boston, MA (1959)
- Fellow, National Research Council, Washington, DC (1949–51).
