= Dounce homogenizer =

Laboratory device for gentle cell lysis

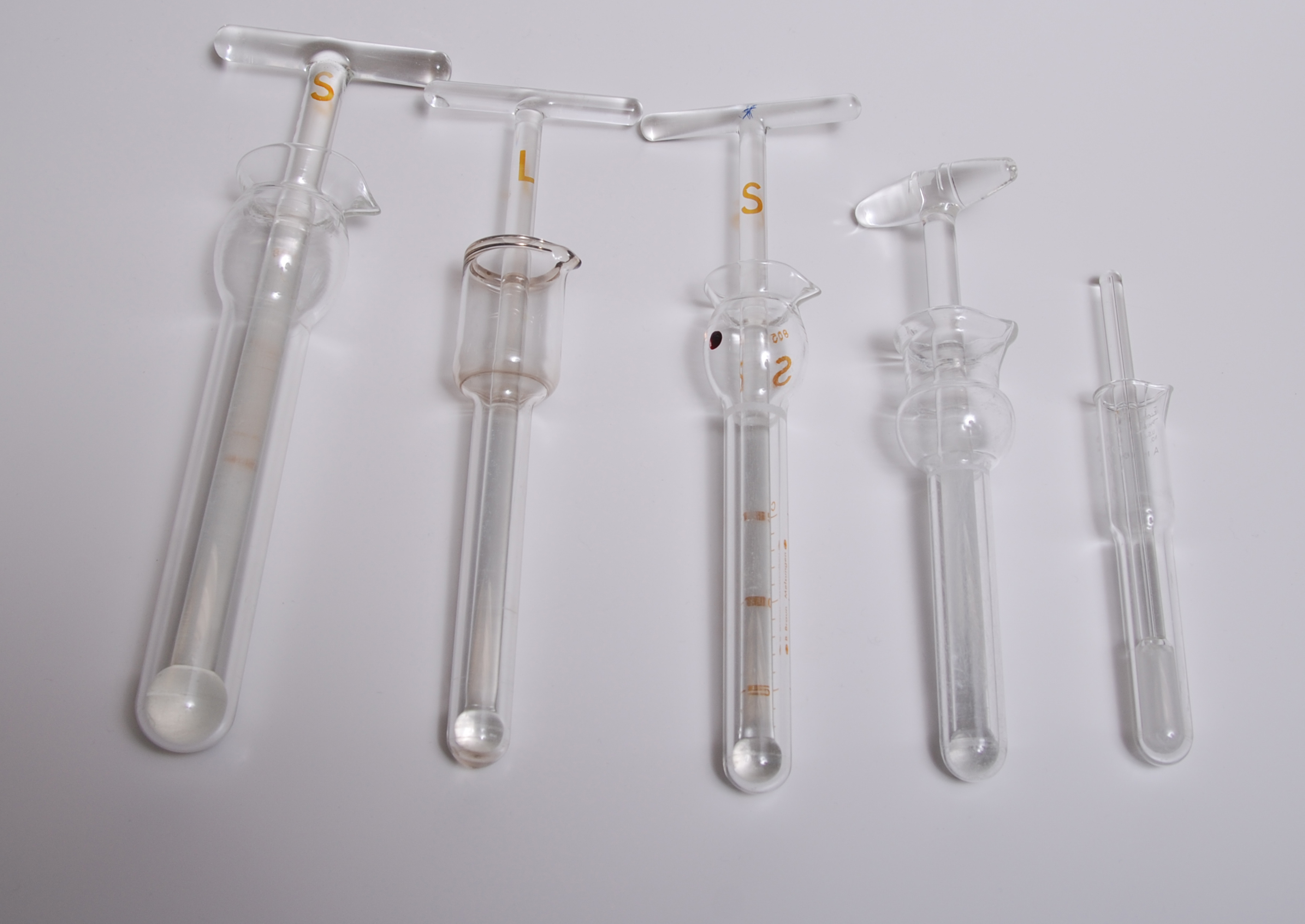
The Dounce homogenizers, devices used for mechanical lysis of tissue or cells, were invented by and named after Alexander Dounce.

Invented by and named for Alexander Dounce , a Dounce homogenizer or "Douncer", is a cylindrical glass tube, closed at one end, with two glass pestles of carefully specified outer diameters, intended for the gentle homogenization of eukaryotic cells (e.g. mammalian cells). Dounce homogenizers are still commonly used today to isolate cellular organelles.

The two Dounce homogenizer pestles (known as the "loose" or "A" and "tight" or "B" pestles), have a carefully specified outer diameter, relative to the inner diameter of the cylinder. The "A" (loose) pestle has a clearance from the cylinder wall of (~0.0025 - 0.0055 in.) while the "B" (tight) pestle has a clearance of (~0.0005 - 0.0025 in.). This allows for tissue and cells to be lysed by shear stress with minimal (if any) degree of heating, thereby leaving extracted organelles or heat-sensitive enzyme complexes largely intact.

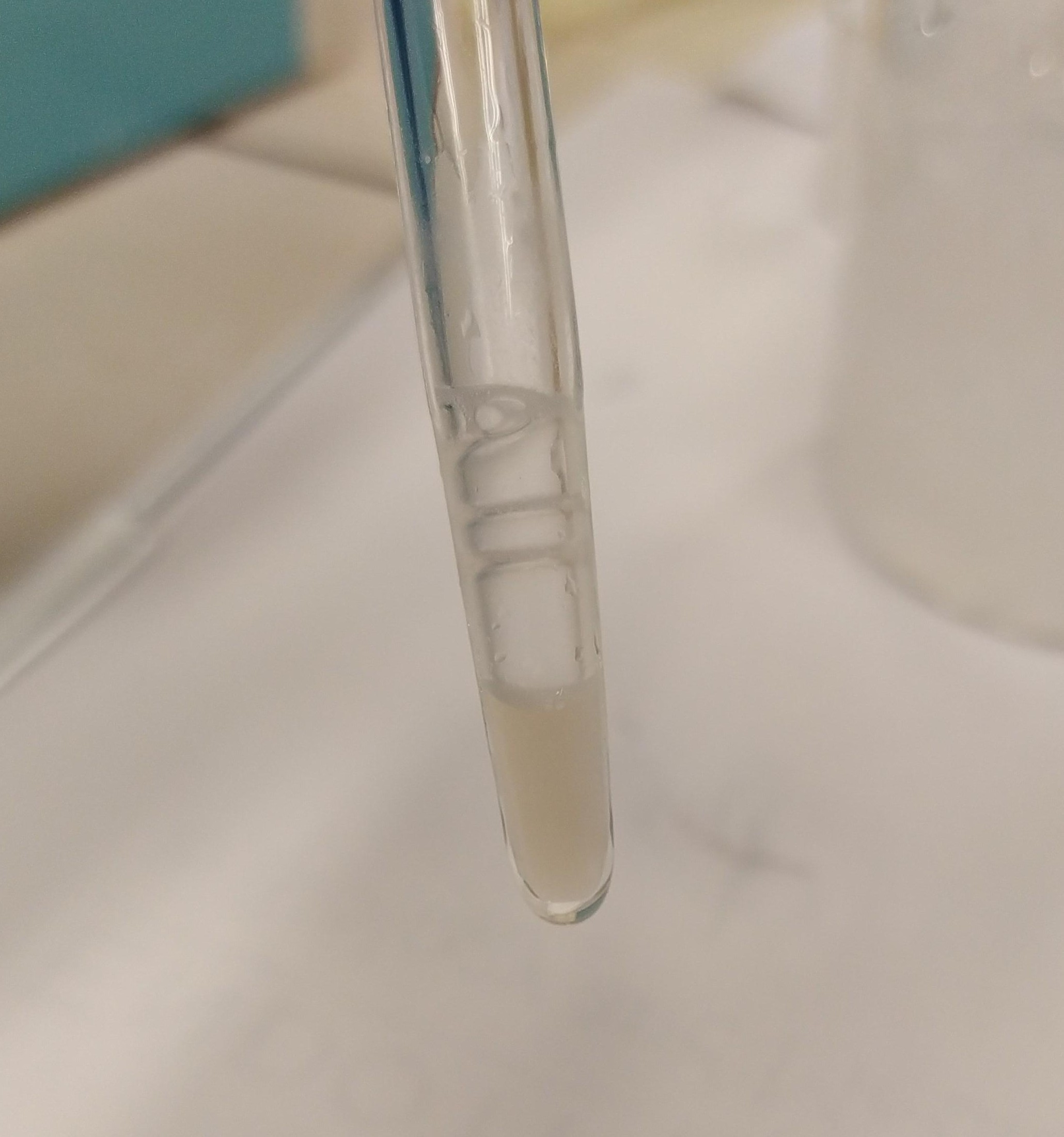
Homogenized mouse hippocampus at the bottom of a Dounce homogenizer tube.

Typically, a soft tissue (e.g. mammalian liver) is cut or broken into smaller pieces and placed into the glass cylinder, alongside a suitable volume of an appropriate lysis buffer. Homogenization is performed by a defined number of "passes" of the pestles, first with the loose pestle, then with the tight pestle, up and down the cylinder. Five to ten passes are typical. Dounce homogenizers are typically produced from borosilicate glass, but are still fragile, and should be used with care. Especially hard or tough tissues should be pre-homogenized before use in a dounce homogenizer.

Eukaryotic cells with tough cell walls, such as Saccharomyces cerevisiae, cannot be directly lysed with a dounce homogenizer, unless the cell wall is first broken down (e.g. with lyticase, or zymolyase in the case of S. cerevisiae).
