= Homogenization (biology) =

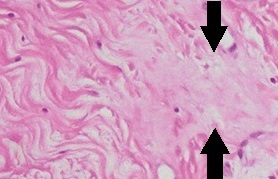
In histopathology, pathologic homogenization is seen as a loss of variations, such as of collagen in lichen sclerosus (pictured).

Homogenization, in cell biology or molecular biology, is a process whereby different fractions of a biological sample become equal in composition. It can be a disease sign in histopathology, or an intentional process in research: A homogenized sample is equal in composition throughout, so that removing a fraction does not alter the overall molecular make-up of the sample remaining, and is identical to the fraction removed. Induced homogenization in biology is often followed by molecular extraction and various analytical techniques, including ELISA and western blot.

== Methods ==
Homogenization of tissue in solution is often performed simultaneously with cell lysis. To prevent lysis however, the tissue (or collection of cells, e.g. from cell culture) can be kept at temperatures slightly above zero to prevent autolysis, and in an isotonic solution to prevent osmotic damage.

If freezing the tissue is possible, cryohomogenization can be performed under "dry" conditions, and is often the method of choice whenever it is desirable to collect several distinct molecular classes (e.g. both protein and RNA) from a single sample, or combined set of samples, or when long-term storage of part of the sample is desired. Cryohomogenization can be carried out using a supercooled mortar and pestle (classic approach), or the tissue can be homogenized by crushing it into a fine powder inside a clean plastic bag resting against a supercooled solid metal block (more recently developed and more efficient technique).

High-pressure homogenization is used to isolate the contents of Gram-positive bacteria, since these cells are exceptionally resistant to lysis, and may be combined with high-temperature sterilization.

Dounce homogenization is a technique suitable for soft mammalian tissues, while lysis of mammalian cells has also been demonstrated via centrifugation.
