= Genomics (journal) =

Peer-reviewed scientific journal

- Discipline: Genomics
- Language: English
- Edited by: Astrid Engel

Publication details
- History: 1987–present
- Publisher: Elsevier
- Open access: Author's choice
- Impact factor: 3.4 (2023)

Standard abbreviations
- ISO 4: Genomics

Indexing
- ISSN: 0888-7543 (print); 1089-8646 (web)

Links
- Journal homepage

Genomics is a peer-reviewed scientific journal in genomics, publishing articles on topics such as comparative genomics, functional genomics, association studies, regulatory DNA elements, and genetics on a genome-wide scale. The journal was established in September 1987.

== Abstracting and indexing ==
The journal is abstracted and indexed in:

- Elsevier Biobase
- BIOSIS Previews
- Biological Abstracts
- Chemical Abstracts
- Current Awareness in Biological Sciences
- Current Contents/Life Sciences
- EMBASE
- EMBiology
- Genetics Abstracts
- MEDLINE
- Science Citation Index Expanded
- Scopus
