= André Boivin =

Boivin in 1935

André Felix Boivin (18 April 1895 – 8 July 1949) was a French biochemist and immunologist who worked on bacterial endotoxins. He worked in Romania and at the Pasteur Institut in Paris. He was also among the first to examine RNA functions in the pre-genomic era.

== Early life ==
Boivin was born in Auxerre where his father was a tailor and his mother came from a family of coopers. After the family went into financial troubles, he began to work at the age of 10, as the oldest child, as a handyman at the Auxerre hospital. His grandfather got him second-hand books from which he taught himself geometry, mathematics and other subjects. He also purchased an old microscope which introduced him to independent exploration. He attended lectures at Ecole Normale from the age of 16 and trained as a school teacher. His high scores allowed him to be join the Ecole Normale Superiere of Saint Cloud as a teacher. He never went to work due to World War I.

== Work ==
Posted to a military hospital in Marseille in 1914 he worked as an assistant to Jean Escat (1866–1924). Escat encouraged Boivin to study medicine at the end of the war and he received a Licence-ès-Sciences in 1921. He then continued to work as an assistant to Escat. After the discovery of insulin in 1921, he was assigned to prepare insulin and developed techniques for it. He then worked on urea assays and submitted this as his thesis at Montpellier in 1926. A Rockefeller grant allowed him to work in Strasbourg under Maurice Nicloux (1873–1945). Here he worked on the measurement of purine and pyrimidine bases which led to a doctorate in 1931. In 1930 he moved to Bucharest and worked with Ion Cantacuzène (1863–1934), giving lectures at the school of medicine. Along with Lydia Mesrobeanu (1908–1978) and Ion Mesrobeanu (1904–1987) he worked on the characterization of bacterial endotoxins using a trichloroacetic acid extraction technique. This was published in 1933 and continued work led to Mesrobeanu's thesis in 1936. In 1935, his laboratory was ransacked and he was forced to leave as a non-Romanian under xenophobic political conditions. He then moved to the Pasteur Institut in Paris under Gaston Ramon. He worked at Garches on gram-positive bacterial toxins and then on gram-negative bacteria, continuing to collaborate with Mesrobeanu. They worked on Shigella toxins and this research was continued by Albert Delaunay who later married Ramon's daughter. From 1938 he headed his own laboratory and received a legion of honour in 1940 from France. In 1947 he moved to Strasbourg as professor of biochemistry. He suffered from intestinal cancer and was hospitalized in 1948 and died a year later. He was buried in Joigny.

Boivin's work along with his colleagues helped establish polysaccharides as being involved in immunity at a time when only proteins were believed to be involved. He was able to show that endotoxins from Agrobacterium tumefaciens were capable of targeting plants and inducing tumours in plants. His work on smooth and rough strains of E. coli would later serve as a tool for the study of bacterial genetics.
