= Sequence hypothesis =

Proposed link between nucleotide sequence and protein structure (1958)

In molecular biology, the sequence hypothesis was first formally proposed in the review "On Protein Synthesis" by Francis Crick in 1958. It states that the sequence of bases in the genetic material (DNA or RNA) determines the sequence of amino acids for which that segment of nucleic acid codes, and this amino acid sequence determines the three-dimensional structure into which the protein folds. The three-dimensional structure of a protein is required for a protein to be functional. This hypothesis then lays the essential link between information stored and inherited in nucleic acids to the chemical processes which enable life to exist.

Or, as Crick put it in 1958:

In its simplest form it [the Sequence Hypothesis] assumes that the specificity of a piece of nucleic acid is expressed solely by the sequence of its bases, and that this sequence is a (simple) code for the amino acid sequence of a particular protein. This hypothesis appears to be rather widely held. Its virtue is that it unites several remarkable pairs of generalisations: the central biochemical importance of proteins and the dominating role of genes, and in particular of their nucleic acid; the linearity of protein molecules (considered covalently) and the genetic linearity within the functional gene [...]; the simplicity of the composition of protein molecules and the simplicity of the nucleic acids.

—

This description is further amplified in the article and, in discussing how a protein folds up into its three-dimensional structure, Crick suggested that "the folding is simply a function of the order of the amino acids" in the protein.

== See also ==
- Central dogma of molecular biology
