= Francis Crick =

English physicist and biologist (1916–2004)

Francis Crick OM FRS
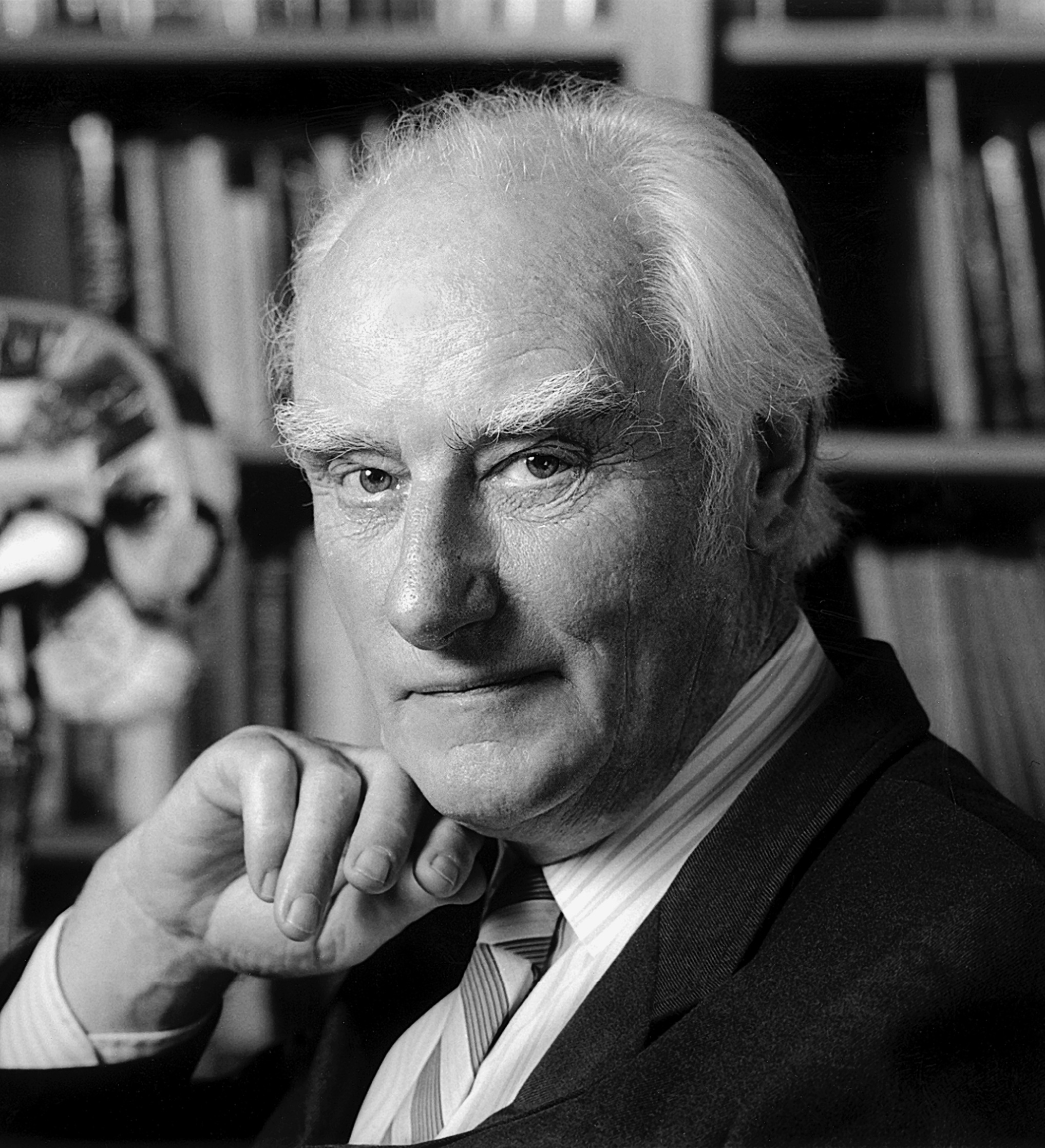
- Born: 8 June 1916; Weston Favell, Northamptonshire, England
- Died: 28 July 2004 (aged 88); San Diego, California, US
- Education: University College London; University of London (BSc); University of Cambridge (PhD)
- Occupations: Molecular biologist; biophysicist; neuroscientist
- Known for: Crick, Brenner et al. experiment; Watson–Crick pair; Coiled coil; DNA structure; mRNA; Adaptor hypothesis; Sequence hypothesis; Wobble hypothesis; Central dogma; Consciousness; Reverse learning; Selfish genetic element
- Spouses: Ruth Doreen Dodd (m. 1940; div. 1947) Odile Speed (m. 1949)
- Children: 3
- Awards: Albert Lasker Award for Basic Medical Research (1960); Gairdner Foundation International Award (1962); Nobel Prize (1962); Mendel Medal (1966); Royal Medal (1972); Copley Medal (1975); Sir Hans Krebs Medal (1977); Albert Medal (1987); Golden Plate Award of the American Academy of Achievement (1987); Order of Merit (1991)
- Scientific career
- Fields: Physics; Molecular biology
- Workplaces: University of Cambridge; University College London; Cavendish Laboratory; Laboratory of Molecular Biology; Salk Institute for Biological Studies
- Thesis: Polypeptides and Proteins: X-Ray Studies (1953)
- Doctoral advisor: Max Perutz
- Doctoral students: None
- Website: www.crick.ac.uk/about-us/francis-crick

Francis Harry Compton Crick (8 June 1916 – 28 July 2004) was an English molecular biologist, biophysicist, and neuroscientist. He, James Watson, Rosalind Franklin, and Maurice Wilkins played crucial roles in deciphering the helical structure of the DNA molecule.

Crick and Watson's paper in Nature in 1953 laid the groundwork for understanding DNA structure and functions. Together with Maurice Wilkins, they were jointly awarded the 1962 Nobel Prize in Physiology or Medicine "for their discoveries concerning the molecular structure of nucleic acids and its significance for information transfer in living material".

Crick was an important theoretical molecular biologist and played a crucial role in research related to revealing the helical structure of DNA. He is widely known for the use of the term "central dogma" to summarise the idea that once information is transferred from nucleic acids (DNA or RNA) to proteins, it cannot flow back to nucleic acids. In other words, the final step in the flow of information from nucleic acids to proteins is irreversible.

During the remainder of his career, Crick held the post of J.W. Kieckhefer Distinguished Research Professor at the Salk Institute for Biological Studies in La Jolla, California. His later research centred on theoretical neurobiology and attempts to advance the scientific study of human consciousness. Crick remained in this post until his death in 2004; "he was editing a manuscript on his death bed, a scientist until the bitter end" according to Christof Koch.

== Early life and education ==
Crick was the first son of Harry Crick and Annie Elizabeth Crick (née Wilkins). He was born on 8 June 1916 and raised in Weston Favell, then a small village near the English town of Northampton, in which Crick's father and uncle ran the family's boot and shoe factory. His grandfather, Walter Drawbridge Crick, an amateur naturalist, wrote a survey of local foraminifera (single-celled protists with shells), corresponded with Charles Darwin, and had two gastropods (snails or slugs) named after him.

At an early age, Crick was attracted to science and what he could learn about it from books. As a child, Crick was taken to church by his parents. However, by about age 12, Crick said that he did not want to go any more as he preferred a scientific search for answers over religious belief.

Crick's uncle, Walter, lived in a small house on the south side of Abington Avenue; he had a shed at the bottom of his little garden where he taught Crick to blow glass, do chemical experiments, and to make photographic prints. At age eight or nine, Crick transferred to the most junior form of the Northampton Grammar School, on Billing Road. This was about 1.25 mi (2 km) from his home so he could walk there and back, by Park Avenue South and Abington Park Crescent, but Crick more often went by bus or, later, by bicycle. The teaching in the higher forms was satisfactory, but not as stimulating. After the age of 14, he was educated at Mill Hill School in London (on a scholarship), where he studied mathematics, physics, and chemistry with his best friend John Shilston. Crick shared the Walter Knox Prize for Chemistry on Mill Hill School's Foundation Day, Friday, 7 July 1933. He declared that his success was founded on the quality of teaching he received whilst a pupil at Mill Hill.

Crick studied at University College London (UCL), a constituent college of the University of London and earned a Bachelor of Science degree awarded by the University of London in 1937. Crick began a PhD at UCL, but was interrupted by World War II. He later became a PhD student and Honorary Fellow of Gonville and Caius College, Cambridge, and mainly worked at the Cavendish Laboratory and the Medical Research Council (MRC) Laboratory of Molecular Biology in Cambridge. Crick was also an Honorary Fellow of Churchill College, Cambridge, and of University College London.

Crick began a PhD research project on measuring the viscosity of water at high temperatures (which he later described as "the dullest problem imaginable") in the laboratory of physicist Edward Neville da Costa Andrade at University College London. However, with the outbreak of World War II (in particular, an incident during the Battle of Britain when a bomb fell through the roof of the laboratory and destroyed his experimental apparatus), Crick was deflected from a possible career in physics. During his second year as a PhD student, Crick was awarded the Carey Foster Research Prize, a great honour. He did postdoctoral work at the Brooklyn Collegiate and Polytechnic Institute, now part of the New York University Tandon School of Engineering.

During World War II, Crick worked for the Admiralty Research Laboratory, from which many notable scientists emerged, including David Bates, Robert Boyd, Thomas Gaskell, George Deacon, John Gunn, Harrie Massey, and Nevill Mott; he worked on the design of magnetic and acoustic mines and was instrumental in designing a new mine that was effective against German minesweepers.

== Post-World-War-II life and work ==
In 1947, aged 31, Crick began studying biology and became part of an important migration of physical scientists into biological research. This migration was made possible by the newly won influence of physicists such as Sir John Randall, who had helped win the war with inventions such as radar. Crick had to adjust from the "elegance and deep simplicity" of physics to the "elaborate chemical mechanisms that natural selection had evolved over billions of years." He described this transition as, "almost as if one had to be born again". According to Crick, the experience of learning physics had taught him something important—hubris—and the conviction that since physics was already a success, great advances should also be possible in other sciences such as biology. Crick felt that this attitude encouraged him to be more daring than typical biologists who tended to concern themselves with the daunting problems of biology and not the past successes of physics.

For the better part of two years, Crick worked on the physical properties of cytoplasm at Cambridge's Strangeways Research Laboratory, headed by Honor Bridget Fell, with a Medical Research Council studentship, until he joined Max Perutz and John Kendrew at the Cavendish Laboratory. The Cavendish Laboratory at Cambridge was under the general direction of Sir Lawrence Bragg, who had won the Nobel Prize in 1915 at age 25. Bragg was influential in the effort to beat a leading American chemist, Linus Pauling, to the discovery of DNA's structure (after having been pipped at the post by Pauling's success in determining the alpha helix structure of proteins). At the same time, Bragg's Cavendish Laboratory was also effectively competing with King's College London, whose Biophysics department was under the direction of Randall (Randall had refused Crick's application to work at King's College). Francis Crick and Maurice Wilkins of King's College were personal friends, which influenced subsequent scientific events as much as the close friendship between Crick and James Watson. Crick and Wilkins first met at King's College and not, as erroneously recorded by two authors, at the Admiralty during World War II.

In 1995, Crick signed the Ashley Montagu Resolution petitioning the International Court of Justice (previously the World Court) to help end genital mutation of children, including female genital mutilation, circumcision, and penile subincision.

== Personal life ==
Crick married twice and fathered three children; his brother Anthony (born in 1918) predeceased him in 1966.

Spouses:

- Ruth Doreen Crick, née Dodd (m. 18 February 1940 – 8 May 1947), who later married James Stewart Potter
- Odile Crick, née Speed (m. 14 August 1949 – 28 July 2004)

Children:

- Michael Francis Compton (b. 25 November 1940) [with Doreen Crick]
- Gabrielle Anne (b. 15 July 1951) [with Odile Crick]
- Jacqueline Marie-Therese [later Nichols] (b. 12 March 1954, d. 28 February 2011) [with Odile Crick];

Crick died of colon cancer on the morning of 28 July 2004 at the University of California, San Diego (UCSD) Thornton Hospital in La Jolla; he was 88 years old. Crick was cremated and his ashes were scattered into the Pacific Ocean. A public memorial was held on 27 September at the Salk Institute, La Jolla, near San Diego, California; guest speakers included James Watson, Sydney Brenner, Alex Rich, Seymour Benzer, Aaron Klug, Christof Koch, Pat Churchland, Vilayanur Ramachandran, Tomaso Poggio, Leslie Orgel, Terry Sejnowski, his son Michael Crick, and his younger daughter Jacqueline Nichols. A private memorial for family and colleagues was held on 3 August 2004.

Crick's Nobel Prize medal and diploma from the Nobel committee was sold at Heritage Auctions in June 2013 for $2,270,000. It was bought by Jack Wang, the CEO of Chinese medical company Biomobie. 20% of the sale price of the medal was donated to the Francis Crick Institute in London.

== Research ==
Crick was interested in two fundamental unsolved problems of biology: how molecules make the transition from the non-living to the living, and how the brain makes a conscious mind. He realised that his background made him more qualified for research on the first topic and the field of biophysics. In 1946, Crick read Erwin Schrödinger's book, What Is Life? and was influenced by it, and Linus Pauling, to switch from physics to biology. It was clear in theory that covalent bonds in biological molecules could provide the structural stability needed to hold genetic information in cells. It only remained as an exercise of experimental biology to discover exactly which molecule was the genetic molecule. In Crick's view, Charles Darwin's theory of evolution by natural selection, Gregor Mendel's genetics and knowledge of the molecular basis of genetics, when combined, revealed the secret of life. Crick had the very optimistic view that life would very soon be created in a test tube. However, some people (such as fellow researcher and colleague Esther Lederberg) thought that Crick was unduly optimistic.

It was clear that some macromolecule such as a protein was likely to be the genetic molecule. However, it was well known that proteins are structural and functional macromolecules, some of which carry out enzymatic reactions of cells. In the 1940s, some evidence had been found pointing to another macromolecule, DNA, the other major component of chromosomes, as a candidate genetic molecule. In the 1944 Avery-MacLeod-McCarty experiment, Oswald Avery and his collaborators showed that a heritable phenotypic difference could be caused in bacteria by providing them with a particular DNA molecule.

However, other evidence was interpreted as suggesting that DNA was structurally uninteresting and possibly just a molecular scaffold for the apparently more interesting protein molecules. Crick was in the right place, in the right frame of mind, at the right time (1949), to join Max Perutz's project at the University of Cambridge, and he began to work on the X-ray crystallography of proteins. X-ray crystallography theoretically offered the opportunity to reveal the molecular structure of large molecules like proteins and DNA, but there were serious technical problems then preventing X-ray crystallography from being applicable to such large molecules.

=== 1949–1950 ===
Crick taught himself the mathematical theory of X-ray crystallography. During the period of Crick's study of X-ray diffraction, researchers in the Cambridge lab were attempting to determine the most stable helical conformation of amino acid chains in proteins (the alpha helix). Linus Pauling was the first to identify the 3.6 amino acids per helix turn ratio of the alpha helix. Crick was witness to the kinds of errors that his co-workers made in their failed attempts to make a correct molecular model of the alpha helix; these turned out to be important lessons that could be applied, in the future, to the helical structure of DNA. For example, he learned the importance of the structural rigidity that double bonds confer on molecular structures which is relevant both to peptide bonds in proteins and the structure of nucleotides in DNA.

=== 1951–1953: DNA structure ===
In 1951 and 1952, together with William Cochran and Vladimir Vand, Crick assisted in the development of a mathematical theory of X-ray diffraction by a helical molecule. This theoretical result matched well with X-ray data for proteins that contain sequences of amino acids in the alpha helix conformation. Helical diffraction theory turned out to also be useful for understanding the structure of DNA.

Late in 1951, Crick started working with James Watson at Cavendish Laboratory at the University of Cambridge, England. Using Rosalind Franklin and her graduate student Raymond Gosling's data, Watson and Crick together developed a model for a helical structure of DNA, which they published in 1953. For this and subsequent work they were jointly awarded the Nobel Prize in Physiology or Medicine in 1962 with Wilkins.

When Watson came to Cambridge, Crick was a 35-year-old graduate student (due to his work during World War II) and Watson was only 23, but had already obtained a PhD. They shared an interest in the fundamental problem of learning how genetic information might be stored in molecular form. Watson and Crick talked endlessly about DNA and the idea that it might be possible to guess a good molecular model of its structure. A key piece of experimentally-derived information came from X-ray diffraction images that had been obtained by Franklin, and Gosling. In July 1951, Wilkins came to Cambridge and shared the data with Watson and Crick. Alexander Stokes (another expert in helical diffraction theory) and Wilkins (both at King's College) had reached the conclusion that X-ray diffraction data for DNA indicated that the molecule had a helical structure—but Franklin vehemently disputed this conclusion. Stimulated by their discussions with Wilkins and what Watson learned by attending a talk given by Franklin about her work on DNA, Crick and Watson produced and showed off an erroneous first model of DNA. Their hurry to produce a model of DNA structure was driven in part by the knowledge that they were competing against Linus Pauling. Given Pauling's recent success in discovering the Alpha helix, they feared that Pauling might also be the first to determine the structure of DNA.

Many have speculated about what might have happened had Pauling been able to travel to Britain as planned in May 1952. As it was, his political activities caused his travel to be restricted by the United States government and he did not visit the UK until later, at which point he met none of the DNA researchers in England. At any rate he was preoccupied with proteins at the time, not DNA. Watson and Crick were not officially working on DNA. Crick was writing his PhD thesis; Watson also had other work such as trying to obtain crystals of myoglobin for X-ray diffraction experiments. In 1952, Watson performed X-ray diffraction on tobacco mosaic virus and found results indicating that it had helical structure. Having failed once, Watson and Crick were now somewhat reluctant to try again and for a while they were forbidden to make further efforts to find a molecular model of DNA.

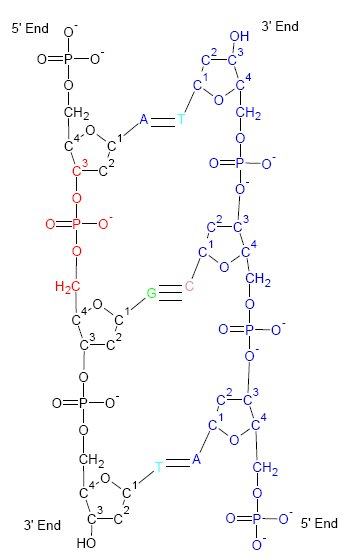
Diagram that emphasises the phosphate backbone of DNA. Watson and Crick first made helical models with the phosphates at the centre of the helices.

Of great importance to the model building effort of Watson and Crick was Rosalind Franklin's understanding of basic chemistry, which indicated that the hydrophilic phosphate-containing backbones of the nucleotide chains of DNA should be positioned so as to interact with water molecules on the outside of the molecule while the hydrophobic bases should be packed into the core. Franklin shared this chemical knowledge with Watson and Crick when she pointed out to them that their first model (from 1951, with the phosphates inside) was obviously wrong.

Crick described what he saw as the failure of Wilkins and Franklin to cooperate and work towards finding a molecular model of DNA as a major reason why he and Watson eventually made a second attempt to do so. They asked for, and received, permission to do so from both William Lawrence Bragg and Wilkins. To construct their model of DNA, Watson and Crick made use of information from unpublished X-ray diffraction images of Franklin's (shown at meetings and freely shared by Wilkins), including preliminary accounts of Franklin's results/photographs of the X-ray images that were included in a written progress report for the King's College laboratory of Sir John Randall from late 1952.

It is a matter of debate whether Watson and Crick should have had access to Franklin's results without her knowledge or permission, and before she had a chance to formally publish the results of her detailed analysis of her X-ray diffraction data which were included in the progress report. However, Watson and Crick found fault in her steadfast assertion that, according to her data, a helical structure was not the only possible shape for DNA—so they had a dilemma. In an effort to clarify this issue, Max Ferdinand Perutz later published what had been in the progress report, and suggested that nothing was in the report that Franklin herself had not said in her talk (attended by Watson) in late 1951. Perutz explained that the report was to a Medical Research Council (MRC) committee that had been created to "establish contact between the different groups of people working for the Council". Randall's and Perutz's laboratories were both funded by the MRC.

It is also not clear how important Franklin's unpublished results from the progress report actually were for the model-building done by Watson and Crick. After the first crude X-ray diffraction images of DNA were collected in the 1930s, William Astbury had talked about stacks of nucleotides spaced at 3.4 angström (0.34 nanometre) intervals in DNA. A citation to Astbury's earlier X-ray diffraction work was one of only eight references in Franklin's first paper on DNA. Analysis of Astbury's published DNA results and the better X-ray diffraction images collected by Wilkins and Franklin revealed the helical nature of DNA. It was possible to predict the number of bases stacked within a single turn of the DNA helix (10 per turn; a full turn of the helix is 27 angströms [2.7 nm] in the compact A form, 34 angströms [3.4 nm] in the wetter B form). Wilkins shared this information about the B form of DNA with Crick and Watson. Crick did not see Franklin's B form X-ray images (Photo 51) until after the DNA double helix model was published.

One of the few references cited by Watson and Crick when they published their model of DNA was to a published article that included Sven Furberg's DNA model that had the bases on the inside. Thus, the Watson and Crick model was not the first "bases in" model to be proposed. Furberg's results had also provided the correct orientation of the DNA sugars with respect to the bases. During their model building, Crick and Watson learned that an antiparallel orientation of the two nucleotide chain backbones worked best to orient the base pairs in the centre of a double helix. Crick's access to Franklin's progress report of late 1952 is what made Crick confident that DNA was a double helix with antiparallel chains, but there were other chains of reasoning and sources of information that also led to these conclusions.

As a result of leaving King's College for Birkbeck College, Franklin was asked by John Randall to give up her work on DNA. When it became clear to Wilkins and the supervisors of Watson and Crick that Franklin was going to the new job, and that Linus Pauling was working on the structure of DNA, they were willing to share Franklin's data with Watson and Crick, in the hope that they could find a good model of DNA before Pauling was able. Franklin's X-ray diffraction data for DNA and her systematic analysis of DNA's structural features were useful to Watson and Crick in guiding them towards a correct molecular model. The key problem for Watson and Crick, which could not be resolved by the data from King's College, was to guess how the nucleotide bases pack into the core of the DNA double helix.

Diagrammatic representation of some key structural features of DNA. The similar structures of guanine:cytosine and adenine:thymine base pairs is illustrated. The base pairs are held together by hydrogen bonds. The phosphate backbones are anti-parallel.

Another key to finding the correct structure of DNA was the so-called Chargaff ratios, experimentally determined ratios of the nucleotide subunits of DNA: the amount of guanine is equal to cytosine and the amount of adenine is equal to thymine. A visit by Erwin Chargaff to England, in 1952, reinforced the salience of this important fact for Watson and Crick. The significance of these ratios for the structure of DNA were not recognised until Watson, persisting in building structural models, realised that A:T and C:G pairs are structurally similar. In particular, the length of each base pair is the same. Chargaff had also pointed out to Watson that, in the aqueous, saline environment of the cell, the predominant tautomers of the pyrimidine (C and T) bases would be the amine and keto configurations of cytosine and thymine, rather than the imino and enol forms that Crick and Watson had assumed. They consulted Jerry Donohue who confirmed the most likely structures of the nucleotide bases. The base pairs are held together by hydrogen bonds, the same non-covalent interaction that stabilise the protein α-helix. The correct structures were essential for the positioning of the hydrogen bonds. These insights led Watson to deduce the true biological relationships of the A:T and C:G pairs. After the discovery of the hydrogen bonded A:T and C:G pairs, Watson and Crick soon had their anti-parallel, double helical model of DNA, with the hydrogen bonds at the core of the helix providing a way to "unzip" the two complementary strands for easy replication: the last key requirement for a likely model of the genetic molecule. As important as Crick's contributions to the discovery of the double helical DNA model were, he stated that without the chance to collaborate with Watson, he would not have found the structure by himself.

Crick did tentatively attempt to perform some experiments on nucleotide base pairing, but he was more of a theoretical biologist than an experimental biologist. There was another near-discovery of the base pairing rules in early 1952. Crick had started to think about interactions between the bases. He asked John Griffith to try to calculate attractive interactions between the DNA bases from chemical principles and quantum mechanics. Griffith's best guess was that A:T and G:C were attractive pairs. At that time, Crick was not aware of Chargaff's rules and he made little of Griffith's calculations, although it did start him thinking about complementary replication. Identification of the correct base-pairing rules (A-T, G-C) was achieved by Watson "playing" with cardboard cut-out models of the nucleotide bases, much in the manner that Linus Pauling had discovered the protein alpha helix a few years earlier. The Watson and Crick discovery of the DNA double helix structure was made possible by their willingness to combine theory, modelling and experimental results (albeit mostly done by others) to achieve their goal.

The DNA double helix structure proposed by Watson and Crick was based upon "Watson-Crick" bonds between the four bases most frequently found in DNA (A, C, T, G) and RNA (A, C, U, G). However, later research showed that triple-stranded, quadruple-stranded and other more complex DNA molecular structures required Hoogsteen base pairing.

In the field of synthetic biology, bases other than A, C, T, and G are used in a synthetic DNA. In addition to synthetic DNA there are also attempts to construct synthetic codons, synthetic endonucleases, synthetic proteins and synthetic zinc fingers. Using synthetic DNA, instead of there being 4^{3} codons, if there are n new bases there could be as many as n^{3} codons. Research is currently being done to see if codons can be expanded to more than three bases. These new codons can code for new amino acids. These synthetic molecules can be used not only in medicine, but in creation of new materials.

The discovery was made on 28 February 1953; the first Watson/Crick paper appeared in Nature on 25 April 1953. Sir Lawrence Bragg, the director of the Cavendish Laboratory, where Watson and Crick worked, gave a talk at Guy's Hospital Medical School in London on Thursday 14 May 1953 which resulted in an article by Ritchie Calder in the News Chronicle of London, on Friday 15 May 1953, entitled "Why You Are You. Nearer Secret of Life." The news reached readers of The New York Times the next day; Victor K. McElheny, in researching his biography, "Watson and DNA: Making a Scientific Revolution", found a clipping of a six-paragraph New York Times article written from London and dated 16 May 1953 with the headline "Form of 'Life Unit' in Cell Is Scanned". The article ran in an early edition and was then pulled to make space for news deemed more important. (The New York Times subsequently ran a longer article on 12 June 1953). The university's undergraduate newspaper Varsity also ran its own short article on the discovery on Saturday 30 May 1953. Bragg's original announcement of the discovery at a Solvay conference on proteins in Belgium on 8 April 1953 went unreported by the British press.

In a seven-page, handwritten letter to his son at a British boarding school on 19 March 1953, Crick explained his discovery, beginning the letter "My Dear Michael, Jim Watson and I have probably made a most important discovery". The letter was put up for auction at Christie's New York on 10 April 2013 with an estimate of $1 to $2 million, eventually selling for $6,059,750, the largest amount ever paid for a letter at auction.

Sydney Brenner, Jack Dunitz, Dorothy Hodgkin, Leslie Orgel, and Beryl M Oughton, were some of the first people in April 1953 to see the model of the structure of DNA, constructed by Crick and Watson; at the time, they were working at Oxford University's Chemistry Department. All were impressed by the new DNA model, especially Brenner who subsequently worked with Crick at Cambridge in the Cavendish Laboratory and the new Laboratory of Molecular Biology. According to the late Dr. Beryl Oughton, later Rimmer, they all travelled together in two cars once Dorothy Hodgkin announced to them that they were off to Cambridge to see the model of the structure of DNA. Orgel also later worked with Crick at the Salk Institute for Biological Studies.

Crick was often described as very talkative, with Watson – in The Double Helix – implying lack of modesty. His personality combined with his scientific accomplishments produced many opportunities for Crick to stimulate reactions from others, both inside and outside the scientific world, which was the centre of his intellectual and professional life. Crick spoke rapidly, and rather loudly, and had an infectious and reverberating laugh, and a lively sense of humour. One colleague from the Salk Institute described him as "a brainstorming intellectual powerhouse with a mischievous smile. ... Francis was never mean-spirited, just incisive. He detected microscopic flaws in logic. In a room full of smart scientists, Francis continually re-earned his position as the heavyweight champ."

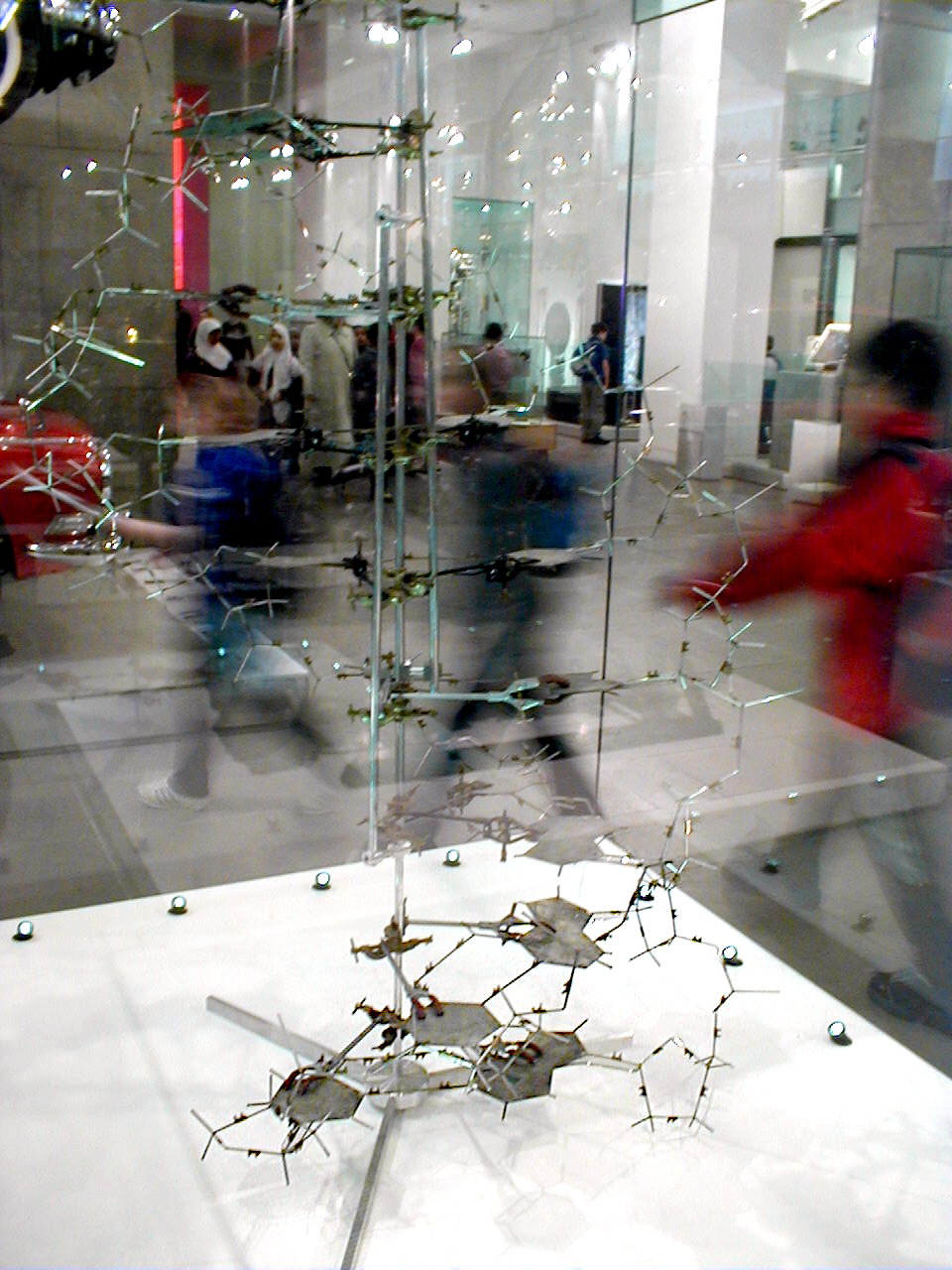
Crick and Watson DNA model built in 1953 was reconstructed largely from its original pieces in 1973 and donated to the National Science Museum in London.

Soon after Crick's death, there have been allegations about him having used LSD when he came to the idea of the helix structure of the DNA. While Crick almost certainly did use LSD, it is unlikely that he did so as early as 1953. In the late 1960s, Crick was given LSD by Henry Todd who met Crick through his girlfriend who had modelled for Crick's wife.

=== Molecular biology ===
In 1954, at age 37, Crick completed his PhD thesis: "X-Ray Diffraction: Polypeptides and Proteins" and received his degree. Crick then worked in the laboratory of David Harker at Brooklyn Polytechnic Institute, where he continued to develop his skills in the analysis of X-ray diffraction data for proteins, working primarily on ribonuclease and the mechanisms of protein synthesis. David Harker, the American X-ray crystallographer, was described as "the John Wayne of crystallography" by Vittorio Luzzati, a crystallographer at the Centre for Molecular Genetics in Gif-sur-Yvette near Paris, who had worked with Rosalind Franklin.

After the discovery of the double helix model of DNA, Crick's interests quickly turned to the biological implications of the structure. In 1953, Watson and Crick published another article in Nature which stated: "it therefore seems likely that the precise sequence of the bases is the code that carries the genetical information".

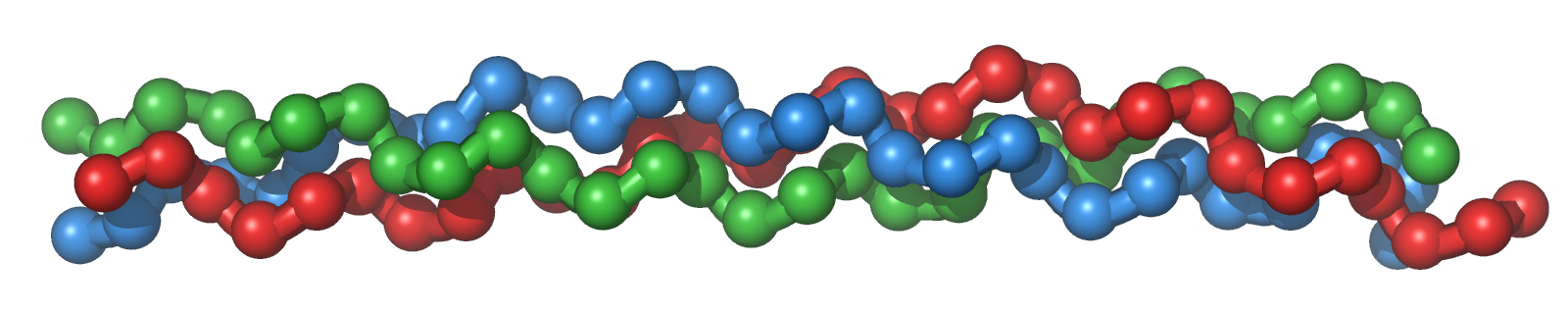
Collagen triple helix

In 1956, Crick and Watson speculated on the structure of small viruses. They suggested that spherical viruses such as Tomato bushy stunt virus had icosahedral symmetry and were made from 60 identical subunits.

After his short time in New York, Crick returned to Cambridge where he worked until 1976, at which time he moved to California. Crick engaged in several X-ray diffraction collaborations such as one with Alexander Rich on the structure of collagen. However, Crick was quickly drifting away from continued work related to his expertise in the interpretation of X-ray diffraction patterns of proteins.

George Gamow established a group of scientists interested in the role of RNA as an intermediary between DNA as the genetic storage molecule in the nucleus of cells and the synthesis of proteins in the cytoplasm (the RNA Tie Club). It was clear to Crick that there had to be a code by which a short sequence of nucleotides would specify a particular amino acid in a newly synthesised protein. In 1956, Crick wrote an informal paper about the genetic coding problem for the small group of scientists in Gamow's RNA group. In this article, Crick reviewed the evidence supporting the idea that there was a common set of about 20 amino acids used to synthesise proteins. Crick proposed that there was a corresponding set of small "adaptor molecules" that would hydrogen bond to short sequences of a nucleic acid, and also link to one of the amino acids. He also explored the many theoretical possibilities by which short nucleic acid sequences might code for the 20 amino acids.

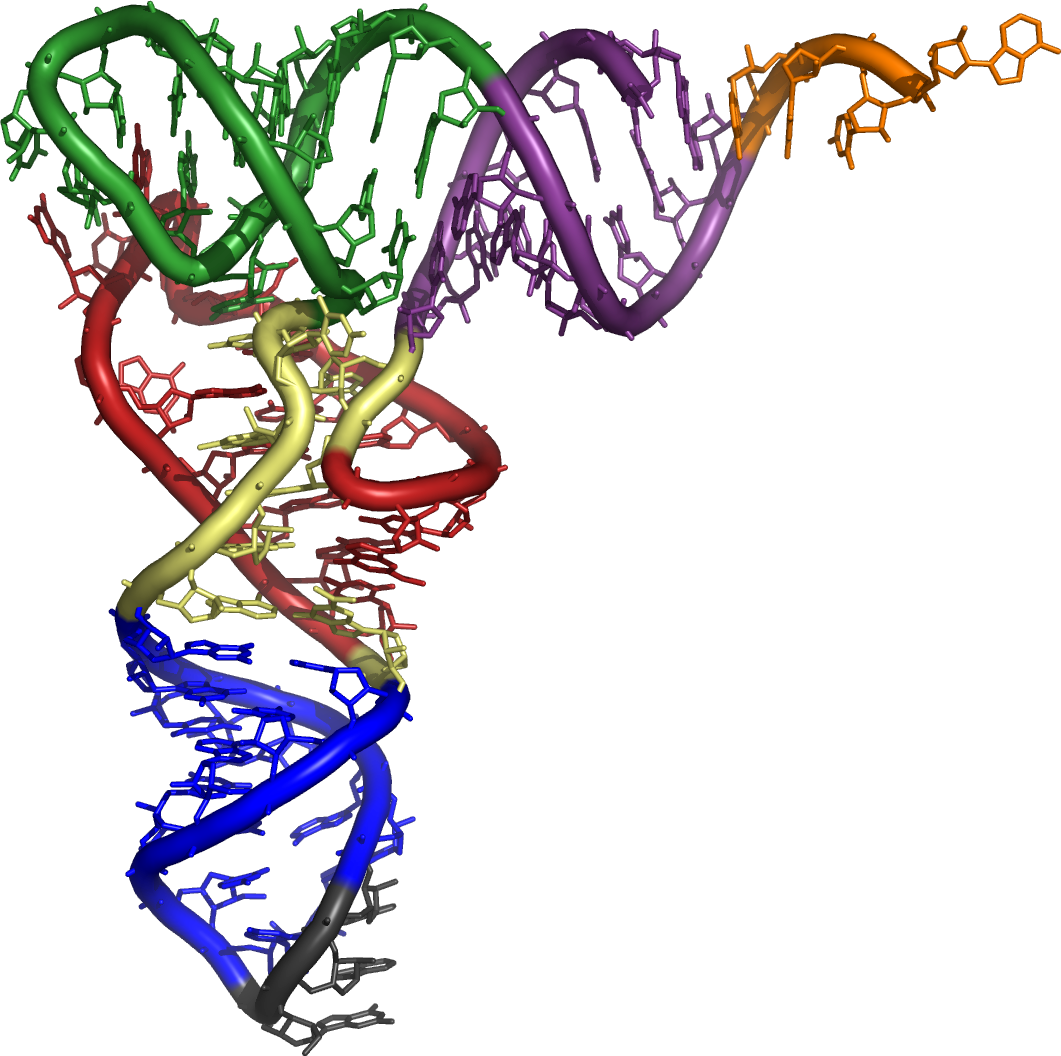
Molecular model of a tRNA molecule. Crick predicted that such adaptor molecules might exist as the links between codons and amino acids.

During the mid-to-late 1950s, Crick was very much intellectually engaged in sorting out the mystery of how proteins are synthesised. By 1958, his thinking had matured and he could list in an orderly way all of the key features of the protein synthesis process:

- genetic information stored in the sequence of DNA molecules
- a "messenger" RNA molecule to carry the instructions for making one protein to the cytoplasm
- adaptor molecules ("they might contain nucleotides") to match short sequences of nucleotides in the RNA messenger molecules to specific amino acids
- ribonucleic-protein complexes that catalyse the assembly of amino acids into proteins according to the messenger RNA

The adaptor molecules were eventually shown to be tRNAs and the catalytic "ribonucleic-protein complexes" became known as ribosomes. An important step was the realisation by Crick and Brenner on 15 April 1960 during a conversation with François Jacob that messenger RNA was not the same thing as ribosomal RNA. Later that summer, Brenner, Jacob, and Matthew Meselson conducted an experiment which was the first to prove the existence of messenger RNA. However, none of this answered the fundamental theoretical question of the exact nature of the genetic code. In his 1958 article, Crick speculated, as had others, that a triplet of nucleotides could code for an amino acid. Such a code might be "degenerate", with 4×4×4=64 possible triplets of the four nucleotide subunits while there were only 20 amino acids. Some amino acids might have multiple triplet codes. Crick also explored other codes in which, for various reasons, only some of the triplets were used, "magically" producing just the 20 needed combinations. Experimental results were needed; theory alone could not decide the nature of the code. Crick also used the term "central dogma" to summarise an idea that implies that genetic information flow between macromolecules would be essentially one-way:

DNA → RNA → protein

Some critics thought that by using the word "dogma", Crick was implying that this was a rule that could not be questioned, but all he really meant was that it was a compelling idea without much solid evidence to support it. In his thinking about the biological processes linking DNA genes to proteins, Crick made explicit the distinction between the materials involved, the energy required, and the information flow. Crick was focused on this third component (information) and it became the organising principle of what became known as molecular biology. Crick had by this time become a highly influential theoretical molecular biologist.

Proof that the genetic code is a degenerate triplet code finally came from genetics experiments, some of which were performed by Crick. The details of the code came mostly from work by Marshall Nirenberg and others who synthesised synthetic RNA molecules and used them as templates for in vitro protein synthesis. Nirenberg first announced his results to a small audience in Moscow at a 1961 conference. Crick's reaction was to invite Nirenberg to deliver his talk to a larger audience.

== Controversy ==
=== Use of other researchers' data ===
Watson and Crick's use of DNA X-ray diffraction data collected by Franklin and Wilkins has generated an enduring controversy. It arose from the fact that some of Franklin's unpublished data were used without her knowledge or consent by Watson and Crick in their construction of the double helix model of DNA. Of the four DNA researchers, only Franklin had a degree in chemistry; Wilkins and Crick had backgrounds in physics, Watson in biology.

Experimental setup of photo 51

Prior to publication of the double helix structure, Watson and Crick had little direct interaction with Franklin herself. They were, however, aware of her work, more aware than she herself realised. Watson was present at a lecture, given in November 1951, where Franklin presented the two forms of the molecule, type A and type B, and discussed the position of the phosphate units on the external part of the molecule. In January 1953, Watson was shown an X-ray photograph of B-DNA (called photograph 51), by Wilkins. Wilkins had been given photograph 51 by Rosalind Franklin's PhD student Raymond Gosling. Wilkins and Gosling had worked together in the Medical Research Council's (MRC) Biophysics Unit before director John Randall appointed Franklin to take over both DNA diffraction work and guidance of Gosling's thesis. It appears that Randall did not communicate effectively with them about Franklin's appointment, contributing to confusion and friction between Wilkins and Franklin. In the middle of February 1953, Crick's thesis advisor, Max Perutz, gave Crick a copy of a report written for a Medical Research Council biophysics committee visit to King's in December 1952, containing data from the King's group, including some of Franklin's crystallographic calculations. Franklin was unaware that photograph 51 and other information had been shared with Crick and Watson. She wrote a series of three draft manuscripts, two of which included a double helical DNA backbone. Her two manuscripts on form A DNA reached Acta Crystallographica in Copenhagen on 6 March 1953, one day before Crick and Watson had completed their model.

The X-ray diffraction images collected by Gosling and Franklin provided the best evidence for the helical nature of DNA. Before this, both Linus Pauling, Watson, and Crick had generated erroneous models with the chains inside and the bases pointing outwards. Her experimental results provided estimates of the water content of DNA crystals, and these results were most consistent with the three sugar-phosphate backbones being on the outside of the molecule. Franklin's X-Ray photograph showed that the backbones had to be on the outside. Although she at first insisted vehemently that her data did not force one to conclude that DNA has a helical structure, in the drafts she submitted in 1953 she argues for a double helical DNA backbone. Building on her manuscripts, she discovered that form A DNA had antiparallel backbones, which supported the double helical structure of DNA. She did this through identification of the space group for DNA crystals. This would go to help Watson and Crick decide to look for DNA models with two antiparallel polynucleotide strands.

In summary, Watson and Crick had three sources for Franklin's unpublished data: 1) her 1951 seminar, attended by Watson, 2) discussions with Wilkins, who worked in the same laboratory with Franklin, 3) a research progress report that was intended to promote coordination of Medical Research Council–supported laboratories. Watson, Crick, Wilkins and Franklin all worked in MRC laboratories.

Crick and Watson felt that they had benefited from collaborating with Wilkins. They offered him a co-authorship on the article that first described the double helix structure of DNA. Wilkins turned down the offer, a fact that may have led to the terse character of the acknowledgement of experimental work done at King's College in the eventual published paper. Rather than make any of the DNA researchers at King's College co-authors on the Watson and Crick double helix article, the solution that was arrived at was to publish two additional papers from King's College along with the helix paper. Brenda Maddox suggests that because of the importance of her experimental results in Watson and Crick's model building and theoretical analysis, Franklin should have had her name on the original Watson and Crick paper in Nature. Franklin and Gosling submitted their own joint "second" paper to Nature at the same time as Wilkins, Stokes, and Wilson submitted theirs (i.e. the "third" paper on DNA).

Watson's portrayal of Franklin in The Double Helix was negative and gave the appearance that she was Wilkins' assistant and was unable to interpret her own DNA data. However, according to Nathaniel C. Comfort, a historian of medicine at Johns Hopkins University, Franklin's colleague Aaron Klug believed that Franklin "..was 'two steps away' from the double helix. After completing an analysis of her lab notebook, Klug stated that she surely would have had it.

The X-ray diffraction images collected by Franklin provided the best evidence for the helical nature of DNA. While Franklin's experimental work proved important to Crick and Watson's development of a correct model, she herself could not realise it at the time. When she left King's College, Director Sir John Randall insisted that all DNA work belonged exclusively to King's and ordered Franklin to not even think about it. Because of this, the scientific community did not understand the depth of Franklin's contributions. Franklin subsequently did superb work in J. D. Bernal's Lab at Birkbeck College with the tobacco mosaic virus, which also extended ideas on helical construction.

=== Eugenics ===
Crick occasionally expressed his views on eugenics, usually in private letters. For example, Crick advocated a form of positive eugenics in which wealthy parents would be encouraged to have more children. He once remarked, "In the long run, it is unavoidable that society will begin to worry about the character of the next generation ... It is not a subject at the moment which we can tackle easily because people have so many religious beliefs and until we have a more uniform view of ourselves I think it would be risky to try and do anything in the way of eugenics ... I would be astonished if, in the next 100 or 200 years, society did not come round to the view that they would have to try to improve the next generation in some extent or one way or another."

=== Sexual harassment allegation ===
Biologist Nancy Hopkins says when she was an undergraduate in the 1960s, Crick put his hands on her breasts during a lab visit. She described the incident: "Before I could rise and shake hands, he had zoomed across the room, stood behind me, put his hands on my breasts and said, 'What are you working on?'"

== Views on religion ==
Crick referred to himself as a humanist, which he defined as the belief "that human problems can and must be faced in terms of human moral and intellectual resources without invoking supernatural authority." He publicly called for humanism to replace religion as a guiding force for humanity, writing:

The human dilemma is hardly new. We find ourselves through no wish of our own on this slowly revolving planet in an obscure corner of a vast universe. Our questioning intelligence will not let us live in cow-like content with our lot. We have a deep need to know why we are here. What is the world made of? More important, what are we made of? In the past religion answered these questions, often in considerable detail. Now we know that almost all these answers are highly likely to be nonsense, having sprung from man's ignorance and his enormous capacity for self-deception ... The simple fables of the religions of the world have come to seem like tales told to children. Even understood symbolically they are often perverse, if not rather unpleasant ... Humanists, then, live in a mysterious, exciting and intellectually expanding world, which, once glimpsed, makes the old worlds of the religions seem fake-cosy and stale

Crick was especially critical of Christianity:

I do not respect Christian beliefs. I think they are ridiculous. If we could get rid of them we could more easily get down to the serious problem of trying to find out what the world is all about.

Crick once joked, "Christianity may be OK between consenting adults in private but should not be taught to young children."

In his book Of Molecules and Men, Crick expressed his views on the relationship between science and religion. After suggesting that it would become possible for a computer to be programmed so as to have a soul, he wondered: at what point during biological evolution did the first organism have a soul? At what moment does a baby get a soul? Crick stated his view that the idea of a non-material soul that could enter a body and then persist after death is just that, an imagined idea. For Crick, the mind is a product of physical brain activity and the brain had evolved by natural means over millions of years. He felt that it was important that evolution by natural selection be taught in schools and that it was regrettable that English schools had compulsory religious instruction. He also considered that a new scientific world view was rapidly being established, and predicted that once the detailed workings of the brain were eventually revealed, erroneous Christian concepts about the nature of humans and the world would no longer be tenable; traditional conceptions of the "soul" would be replaced by a new understanding of the physical basis of mind. He was sceptical of organised religion, referring to himself as a sceptic and an agnostic with "a strong inclination towards atheism".

In 1960, Crick accepted an honorary fellowship at Churchill College, Cambridge, one factor being that the new college did not have a chapel. Some time later a large donation was made to establish a chapel and the College Council decided to accept it. Crick resigned his fellowship in protest.

In October 1969, Crick participated in a celebration of the 100th year of the journal Nature in which he attempted to make some predictions about what the next 30 years would hold for molecular biology. His speculations were later published in Nature. Near the end of the article, Crick briefly mentioned the search for life on other planets, but he held little hope that extraterrestrial life would be found by the year 2000. He also discussed what he described as a possible new direction for research, what he called "biochemical theology". Crick wrote "so many people pray that one finds it hard to believe that they do not get some satisfaction from it". A field similar to Crick's hypothesised "biochemical theology" now exists as neurotheology.

Crick suggested that it might be possible to find chemical changes in the brain that were molecular correlates of the act of prayer. He speculated that there might be a detectable change in the level of some neurotransmitter or neurohormone when people pray. Crick's view of the relationship between science and religion continued to play a role in his work as he made the transition from molecular biology research into theoretical neuroscience.

Crick asked in 1998 "and if some of the Bible is manifestly wrong, why should any of the rest of it be accepted automatically? ... And what would be more important than to find our true place in the universe by removing one by one these unfortunate vestiges of earlier beliefs?"

In 2003 he was one of 22 Nobel laureates who signed the Humanist Manifesto.

=== Creationism ===
Crick was a firm critic of young Earth creationism. In the 1987 United States Supreme Court case Edwards v. Aguillard, Crick joined a group of other Nobel laureates who advised, "'Creation-science' simply has no place in the public-school science classroom." Crick was also an advocate for the establishment of Darwin Day as a British national holiday.

== Directed panspermia ==
During the 1960s, Crick became concerned with the origins of the genetic code. In 1966, he took the place of Leslie Orgel at a meeting where Orgel was to talk about the origin of life. Crick speculated about possible stages by which an initially simple code with a few amino acid types might have evolved into the more complex code used by existing organisms. At that time, proteins were thought to be the only kind of enzyme, and ribozymes had not yet been identified. Many molecular biologists were puzzled by the problem of the origin of a protein replicating system that is as complex as that which exists in organisms currently inhabiting Earth. In the early 1970s, Crick and Orgel further speculated about the possibility that the production of living systems from molecules may have been a very rare event in the universe, but once it had developed it could be spread by intelligent life forms using space travel technology, a process they called "directed panspermia". In a retrospective article, Crick and Orgel noted that they had been unduly pessimistic about the chances of abiogenesis on Earth when they had assumed that some kind of self-replicating protein system was the molecular origin of life.

In 1976, Crick addressed the origin of protein synthesis in a paper with Sydney Brenner, Aaron Klug, and George Pieczenik. In this paper, they speculate that code constraints on nucleotide sequences allow protein synthesis without the need for a ribosome. It, however, requires a five base binding between the mRNA and tRNA with a flip of the anti-codon creating a triplet coding, even though it is a five-base physical interaction. Thomas H. Jukes pointed out that the code constraints on the mRNA sequence required for this translation mechanism is still preserved.

== Neuroscience and other interests ==
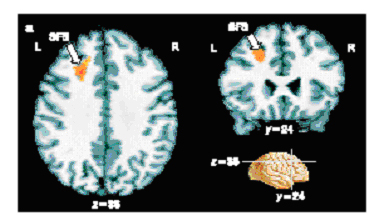
Results from an fMRI experiment in which people made a conscious decision about a visual stimulus. The small region of the brain coloured orange shows patterns of activity that correlate with the decision making process. Crick stressed the importance of finding new methods to probe human brain function.

Crick's period at Cambridge was the pinnacle of his long scientific career, but he left Cambridge in 1977 after 30 years, having been offered (and having refused) the Mastership of Gonville and Caius. James Watson claimed at a Cambridge conference marking the 50th anniversary of the discovery of the structure of DNA in 2003:

Now perhaps it's a pretty well kept secret that one of the most uninspiring acts of the University of Cambridge over this past century was to turn down Francis Crick when he applied to be the Professor of Genetics, in 1958. Now there may have been a series of arguments, which led them to reject Francis. It was really saying, don't push us to the frontier.

The apparently "pretty well kept secret" had already been recorded in Soraya De Chadarevian's Designs For Life: Molecular Biology After World War II, published by Cambridge University Press in 2002. His major contribution to molecular biology in Cambridge is well documented in The History of the University of Cambridge: Volume 4 (1870 to 1990), which was published by CUP in 1992.

According to the University of Cambridge's genetics department official website, the electors of the professorship could not reach consensus, prompting the intervention of then University Vice-Chancellor Lord Adrian. Lord Adrian first offered the professorship to a compromise candidate, Guido Pontecorvo, who refused, and is said to have offered it then to Crick, who also refused.

In 1976, Crick took a sabbatical year at the Salk Institute for Biological Studies in La Jolla, California. Crick had been a nonresident fellow of the Institute since 1960. Crick wrote, "I felt at home in Southern California." After the sabbatical, Crick left Cambridge to continue working at the Salk Institute. He was also an adjunct professor at the University of California, San Diego. He taught himself neuroanatomy and studied many other areas of neuroscience research. It took him several years to disengage from molecular biology because exciting discoveries continued to be made, including the discovery of alternative splicing and the discovery of restriction enzymes, which helped make possible genetic engineering. Eventually, in the 1980s, Crick was able to devote his full attention to his other interest, consciousness. His autobiographical book, What Mad Pursuit: A Personal View of Scientific Discovery, includes a description of why he left molecular biology and switched to neuroscience.

Upon taking up work in theoretical neuroscience, Crick was struck by several things:

- there were many isolated subdisciplines within neuroscience with little contact between them
- many people who were interested in behaviour treated the brain as a black box
- consciousness was viewed as a taboo subject by many neurobiologists

Crick hoped he might aid progress in neuroscience by promoting constructive interactions between specialists from the many different subdisciplines concerned with consciousness. He also collaborated with neurophilosophers such as Patricia Churchland. In 1983, as a result of their studies of computer models of neural networks, Crick and Mitchison proposed that the function of REM sleep and dreaming is to remove certain modes of interactions in networks of cells in the mammalian cerebral cortex; they called this hypothetical process "reverse learning" or "unlearning". In the final phase of his career, Crick established a collaboration with Christof Koch that led to publication of a series of articles on consciousness during the period spanning from 1990 to 2005. Crick made the strategic decision to focus his theoretical investigation of consciousness on how the brain generates visual awareness within a few hundred milliseconds of viewing a scene. Crick and Koch proposed that consciousness seems so mysterious because it involves very short-term memory processes that are as yet poorly understood. In his book The Astonishing Hypothesis, Crick described how neurobiology had reached a mature enough stage so that consciousness could be the subject of a unified effort to study it at the molecular, cellular and behavioural levels. Crick was sceptical about the value of computational models of mental function that are not based on details about brain structure and function.

Crick was aware that research on consciousness was a difficult task, as he wrote to Martynas Yčas in April 1996:

I don't think we shall fully understand consciousness by the end of this century, but it's possible we can get a glimpse of the answer by then. Whether it will all fall into place, as molecular biology did, without a vital force, or whether we need a radical formulation, only time will tell. Best wishes, Yours, Francis. P.S. By the way, I've not been knighted.

== Awards and honours ==
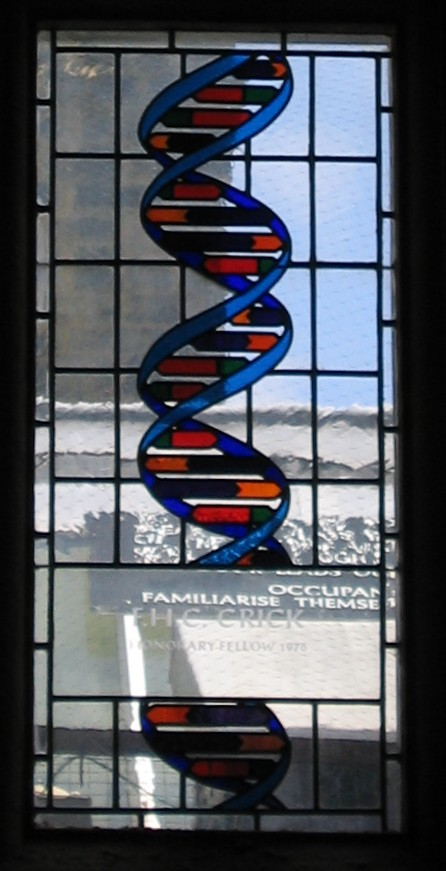
Stained glass window in the dining hall of Caius College, in Cambridge, commemorating Francis Crick and representing the double helical structure of B-DNA

In addition to his third share of the 1962 Nobel Prize for Physiology or Medicine, Crick received many awards and honours, including the Royal and Copley medals of the Royal Society (1972 and 1975), and also the Order of Merit (on 27 November 1991); he refused an offer of a CBE in 1963, but was often referred to in error as 'Sir Francis Crick' and even on occasions as 'Lord Crick'. Crick was elected an EMBO Member in 1964.

The award of Nobel Prizes to John Kendrew and Max Perutz, and to Crick, Watson, and Wilkins was satirised in a short sketch in the BBC TV programme That Was The Week That Was with the Nobel Prizes being referred to as 'The Alfred Nobel Peace Pools'.

Crick was an elected member of the American Academy of Arts and Sciences (1962), the United States National Academy of Sciences (1969), and the American Philosophical Society (1972).

=== Francis Crick Medal and Lecture ===
The Francis Crick Medal and Lecture was established in 2003 following an endowment by his former colleague, Sydney Brenner, joint winner of the 2002 Nobel Prize in Physiology and Medicine. The lecture is delivered annually in any field of biological sciences, with preference given to the areas in which Francis Crick himself worked. Importantly, the lectureship is aimed at younger scientists, ideally under 40, or whose career progression corresponds to this age. As of 2019, Crick's lectures have been delivered by Julie Ahringer, Dario Alessi, Ewan Birney, Simon Boulton, Jason Chin, Simon Fisher, Matthew Hurles, Gilean McVean, Duncan Odom, Geraint Rees, Sarah Teichmann, M. Madan Babu and Daniel Wolpert.

=== Francis Crick Institute ===
The Francis Crick Institute is a £660 million biomedical research centre located in central London, United Kingdom. The Francis Crick Institute is a partnership between Cancer Research UK, Imperial College London, King's College London, the Medical Research Council, University College London (UCL) and the Wellcome Trust. Completed in 2016, it is the largest centre for biomedical research and innovation in Europe.

=== Francis Crick Graduate Lectures ===
The University of Cambridge Graduate School of Biological, Medical and Veterinary Sciences hosts The Francis Crick Graduate Lectures. The first two lectures were by John Gurdon and Tim Hunt.

=== Other honours ===
- Crick was elected a Fellow of the Royal Society (FRS) in 1959, a Fellow of the International Academy of Humanism, and a Fellow of CSICOP.
- In 1987, Crick received the Golden Plate Award of the US Academy of Achievement.
- The inscription on the helices of a DNA sculpture (which was donated by James Watson) outside Thirkill Court, Clare College, Cambridge, reads: "The structure of DNA was discovered in 1953 by Francis Crick and James Watson while Watson lived here at Clare." and on the base: "The double helix model was supported by the work of Rosalind Franklin and Maurice Wilkins."
- Another sculpture entitled Discovery, by artist Lucy Glendinning, was installed on 13 December 2005 in Abington Street, Northampton. According to the late Lynn Wilson, chairman of the Wilson Foundation, "The sculpture celebrates the life of a world class scientist who must surely be considered the greatest Northamptonian of all time — by discovering DNA he unlocked the whole future of genetics and the alphabet of life."
- Westminster City Council unveiled a green plaque to Francis Crick on the front façade of 56 St George's Square, Pimlico, London SW1 on 20 June 2007; Crick lived in the first floor flat, together with Robert Dougall of BBC radio and later TV fame, a former Royal Navy associate.
- At a meeting of the executive council of the Committee for Skeptical Inquiry (CSI) (formerly CSICOP) in Denver, Colorado in April 2011, Crick was selected for inclusion in CSI's Pantheon of Skeptics. The Pantheon of Skeptics was created by CSI to remember the legacy of deceased fellows of CSI and their contributions to the cause of scientific scepticism.
- A sculpted bust of Francis Crick by John Sherrill Houser, which incorporates a single "Golden" Helix, was cast in bronze in the artist's studio in New Mexico, US. The bronze was first displayed at the Francis Crick Memorial Conference (on Consciousness) at Churchill College, Cambridge on 7 July 2012; it was bought by Mill Hill School in May 2013, and displayed at the inaugural Crick Dinner on 8 June 2013, and was again at their Crick Centenary Dinner in 2016.
- The Benjamin Franklin Medal for Distinguished Achievement in the Sciences of the American Philosophical Society (2001), together with Watson.
- Crick featured in the BBC Radio 4 series The New Elizabethans to mark the Diamond Jubilee of Elizabeth II in 2012. A panel of seven academics, journalists and historians named Crick among a group of 60 people in the UK "whose actions during the reign of Elizabeth II have had a significant impact on lives in these islands and given the age its character".

== Books ==
- Of Molecules and Men (Prometheus Books, 2004; original edition 1967) ISBN 1-59102-185-5
- Life Itself: Its Origin and Nature (Simon & Schuster, 1981) ISBN 0-671-25562-2
- What Mad Pursuit: A Personal View of Scientific Discovery (Basic Books reprint edition, 1990) ISBN 0-465-09138-5
- The Astonishing Hypothesis: The Scientific Search for the Soul (Scribner reprint edition, 1995) ISBN 0-684-80158-2
- Georg Kreisel: a Few Personal Recollections. In: Kreiseliana: About and Around Georg Kreisel (1996), pp. 25–32. ISBN 1-56881-061-X

== See also ==
- Crick, Brenner et al. experiment – DNA structure discovery
- Crick's wobble hypothesis – RNA base pair that does not follow Watson–Crick base pair rules
- History of RNA biology
- List of RNA biologists
- Molecular structure of Nucleic Acids – 1953 scientific paper on DNA
- Neural correlates of consciousness – Neuronal events sufficient for a specific conscious percept

== Sources ==
- Crick, Francis (1990). What Mad Pursuit: a Personal View of Scientific Discovery (reprint ed.). New York: Basic Books. ISBN 0-465-09138-5.
- Maddox, Brenda (2002). Rosalind Franklin: the dark lady of DNA. London: HarperCollins. ISBN 0-06-018407-8.
- Olby, Robert (2009). Francis Crick: Hunter of Life's Secrets. Cold Spring Harbor Laboratory Press. ISBN 978-0-87969-798-3.
- Ridley, Matt (2006). Francis Crick: Discoverer of the Genetic Code. Ashland, OH: Atlas Books. ISBN 0-06-082333-X.
- Wilkins, Maurice (2003). The Third Man of the Double Helix: The Autobiography of Maurice Wilkins. Oxford University Press. ISBN 0-19-860665-6.
