= What Mad Pursuit =

1988 book by Francis Crick

- Author: Francis Crick
- Language: English
- Publisher: Basic Books
- Publication date: 1988
- Publication place: United States
- ISBN: 0-465-09137-7

What Mad Pursuit: A Personal View of Scientific Discovery is a book published in 1988 and written by Francis Crick, the English co-discoverer in 1953 of the structure of DNA. In the book, Crick gives important insights into his work on the DNA structure, along with the central dogma of molecular biology and the genetic code, and his later work on neuroscience.

== Description ==
The main purpose of Crick's book is to describe some of his experiences before and during the "classical period" of molecular biology from the 1953 discovery of the DNA double helix to the 1966 elucidation of the genetic code. There is a prologue outlining Crick's upbringing, education, and war work on magnetic and acoustic mines, and following World War II his decision on what branch of science to study, using the "gossip test". (Your interests are revealed by your gossip.) There is also an epilogue that outlines Crick's work after 1966, his move to the Salk Institute with his career transition to neuroscience concentrating on visual consciousness in primates, and some of his conclusions regarding research in theoretical biology, especially with regard to the brain sciences.

Crick comments on various aspects of the DNA double helix discovery and gives a qualified endorsement to the 1987 television movie Life Story with Jeff Goldblum as Jim Watson and Tim Pigott-Smith as Francis Crick. There is a clear presentation of the basic ideas of molecular biology with appendices "A Brief Outline of Classical Molecular Biology" and "The Genetic Code." Crick gives some anecdotes and explains some important ideas and insights without too much technical jargon.

According to the Nobel prize-winning physicist Philip W. Anderson, the basic goal of experimental science is "learning the truth about the world around us. Crick's words are as good a guide to that end as I have seen."

"This is a book to be read more than once; the beauty of its style masks much hard science and subtle thought. In spite of having heard it many times from others, the story of DNA as told by Crick still makes a marvelous read. A sense of clarity of thought combined with an equally strong sense of commitment and overlaid with the deep power of his thinking runs through the book. One sees that Crick possesses that all-important but dismayingly elusive knack of distinguishing what is significant from what is not. His confidence in the power of structural chemistry to unravel the functioning of biological molecule is unflagging. At the same time, warning signals sound constantly to keep possible evolutionary arbitrariness in mind".
