= Molecular models of DNA =

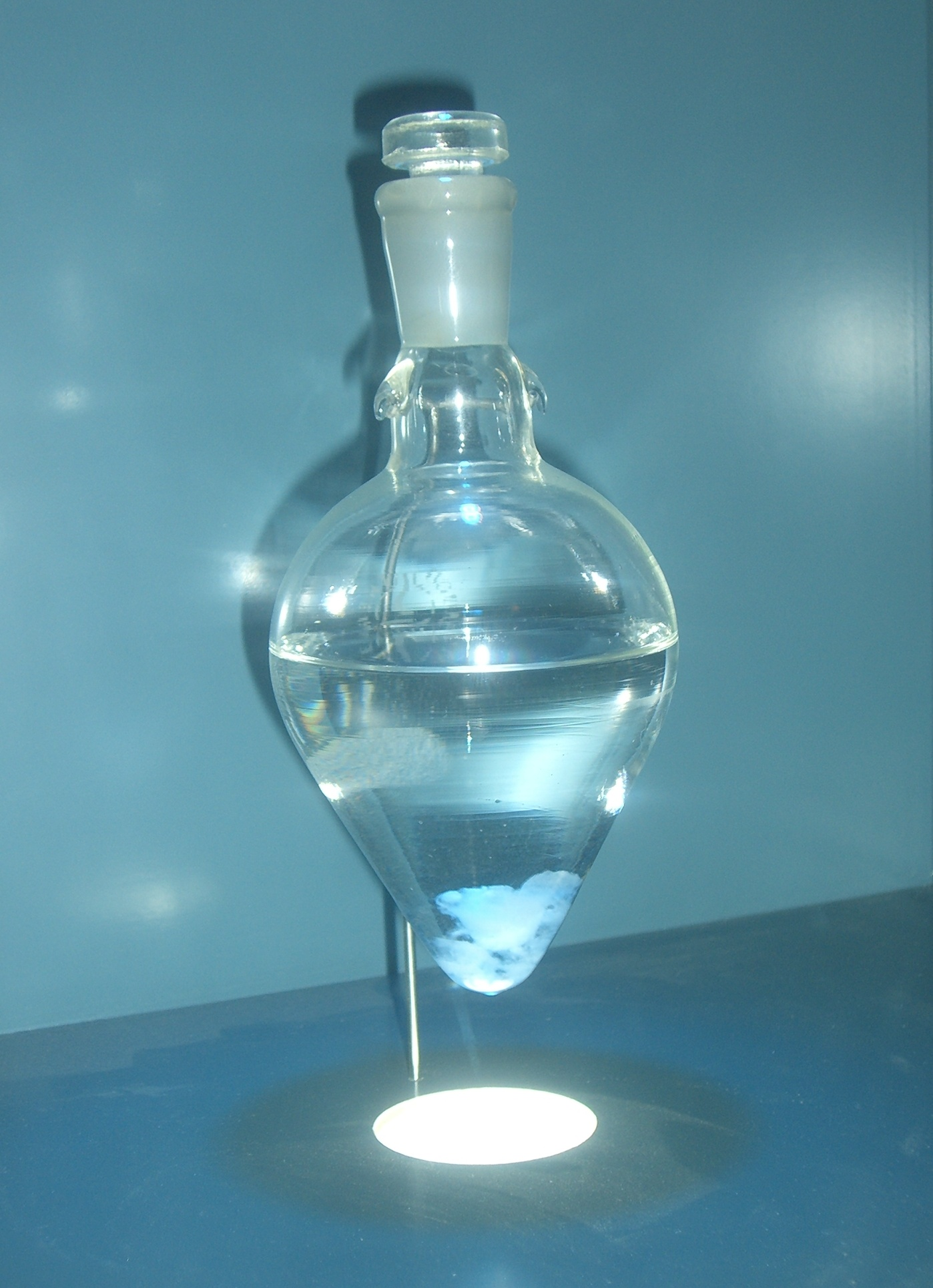
While this purified DNA precipitated in a flask of water (left) appears to be a formless mass to the naked eye, at the nanoscale, nucleic acids possess intricate structure (right).

Molecular models of DNA structures are representations of the molecular geometry and topology of deoxyribonucleic acid (DNA) molecules using one of several means, with the aim of simplifying and presenting the essential, physical and chemical, properties of DNA molecular structures either in vivo or in vitro. These representations include closely packed spheres (CPK models) made of plastic, metal wires for skeletal models, graphic computations and animations by computers, artistic rendering. Computer molecular models also allow animations and molecular dynamics simulations that are very important for understanding how DNA functions in vivo.

The more advanced, computer-based molecular models of DNA involve molecular dynamics simulations and quantum mechanics computations of vibro-rotations, delocalized molecular orbitals (MOs), electric dipole moments, hydrogen-bonding, and so on. DNA molecular dynamics modeling involves simulating deoxyribonucleic acid (DNA) molecular geometry and topology changes with time as a result of both intra- and inter- molecular interactions of DNA. Whereas molecular models of DNA molecules such as closely packed spheres (CPK models) made of plastic or metal wires for skeletal models are useful representations of static DNA structures, their usefulness is very limited for representing complex DNA dynamics. Computer molecular modeling allows both animations and molecular dynamics simulations that are very important to understand how DNA functions in vivo.

== History ==
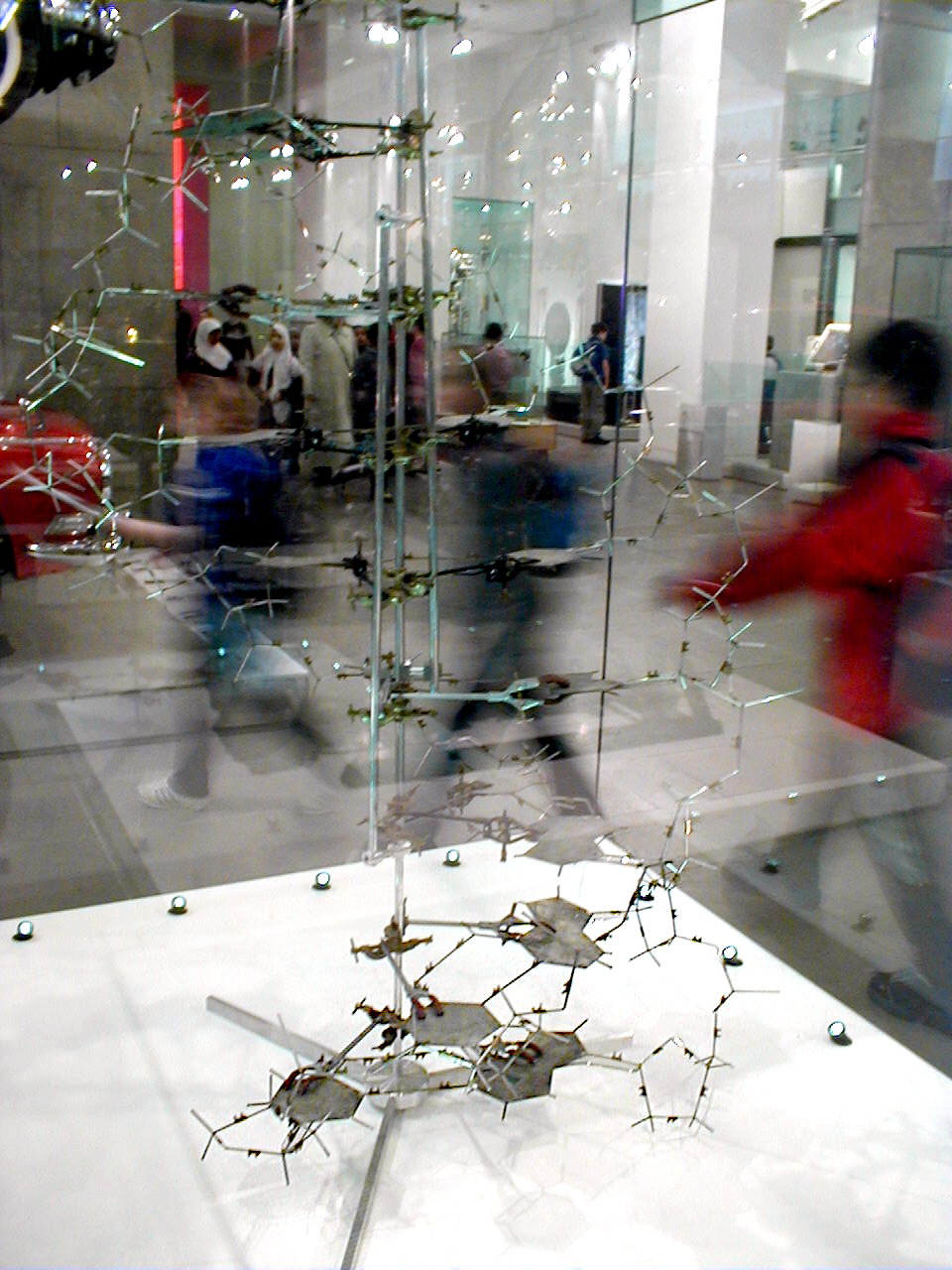
The 1953 A-DNA double helix molecular model of Crick and Watson (consistent with X-ray data) for which they, with M.H.F. Wilkins, received a Nobel Prize.

From the very early stages of structural studies of DNA by X-ray diffraction and biochemical means, molecular models such as the Watson-Crick nucleic acid double helix model were successfully employed to solve the 'puzzle' of DNA structure, and also find how the latter relates to its key functions in living cells. The first high quality X-ray diffraction patterns of A-DNA were reported by Rosalind Franklin and Raymond Gosling in 1953. Rosalind Franklin made the critical observation that DNA exists in two distinct forms, A and B, and produced the sharpest pictures of both through X-ray diffraction technique. The first calculations of the Fourier transform of an atomic helix were reported one year earlier by Cochran, Crick and Vand, and were followed in 1953 by the computation of the Fourier transform of a coiled-coil by Crick.

Structural information is generated from X-ray diffraction studies of oriented DNA fibers with the help of molecular models of DNA that are combined with crystallographic and mathematical analysis of the X-ray patterns.

The first reports of a double helix molecular model of B-DNA structure were made by James Watson and Francis Crick in 1953. That same year, Maurice F. Wilkins, A. Stokes and H.R. Wilson, reported the first X-ray patterns of in vivo B-DNA in partially oriented salmon sperm heads.

The development of the first correct double helix molecular model of DNA by Crick and Watson may not have been possible without the biochemical evidence for the nucleotide base-pairing ([A---T]; [C---G]), or Chargaff's rules. Although such initial studies of DNA structures with the help of molecular models were essentially static, their consequences for explaining the in vivo functions of DNA were significant in the areas of protein biosynthesis and the quasi-universality of the genetic code. Epigenetic transformation studies of DNA in vivo were however much slower to develop despite their importance for embryology, morphogenesis and cancer research. Such chemical dynamics and biochemical reactions of DNA are much more complex than the molecular dynamics of DNA physical interactions with water, ions and proteins/enzymes in living cells.

== Importance ==
An old standing dynamic problem is how DNA "self-replication" takes place in living cells that should involve transient uncoiling of supercoiled DNA fibers. Although DNA consists of relatively rigid, very large elongated biopolymer molecules called fibers or chains (that are made of repeating nucleotide units of four basic types, attached to deoxyribose and phosphate groups), its molecular structure in vivo undergoes dynamic configuration changes that involve dynamically attached water molecules and ions. Supercoiling, packing with histones in chromosome structures, and other such supramolecular aspects also involve in vivo DNA topology which is even more complex than DNA molecular geometry, thus turning molecular modeling of DNA into an especially challenging problem for both molecular biologists and biotechnologists. Like other large molecules and biopolymers, DNA often exists in multiple stable geometries (that is, it exhibits conformational isomerism) and configurational, quantum states which are close to each other in energy on the potential energy surface of the DNA molecule.

Such varying molecular geometries can also be computed, at least in principle, by employing ab initio quantum chemistry methods that can attain high accuracy for small molecules, although claims that acceptable accuracy can be also achieved for polynuclelotides, and DNA conformations, were recently made on the basis of vibrational circular dichroism (VCD) spectral data. Such quantum geometries define an important class of ab initio molecular models of DNA which exploration has barely started, especially related to results obtained by VCD in solutions. More detailed comparisons with such ab initio quantum computations are in principle obtainable through 2D-FT NMR spectroscopy and relaxation studies of polynucleotide solutions or specifically labeled DNA, as for example with deuterium labels.

In an interesting twist of roles, the DNA molecule was proposed to be used for quantum computing via DNA. Both DNA nanostructures and DNA computing biochips have been built.

== Fundamental concepts ==
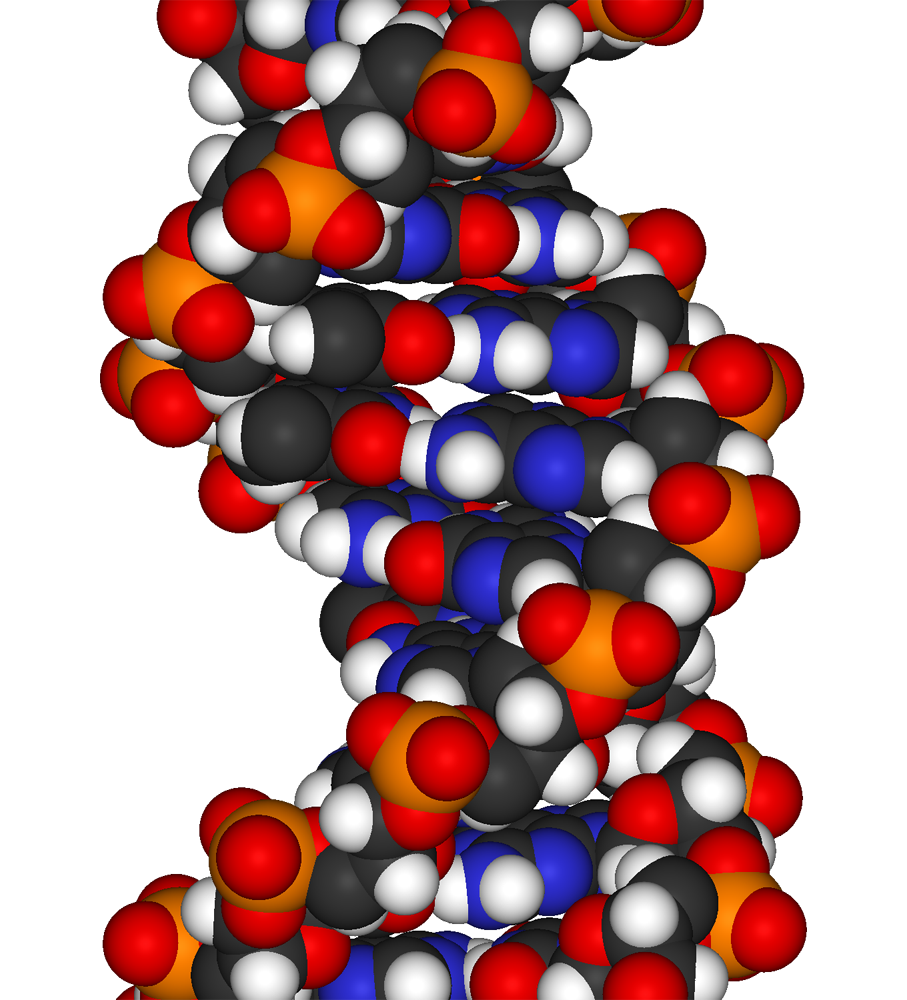
At left, the chemical structure of DNA showing the base-pairing. This depiction of a DNA duplex lacks information about the molecule's three-dimensional structure, at right.

The chemical structure of DNA is insufficient to understand the complexity of the 3D structures of DNA. In contrast, animated molecular models allow one to visually explore the three-dimensional (3D) structure of DNA. The DNA model shown (far right) is a space-filling, or CPK, model of the DNA double helix. Animated molecular models, such as the wire, or skeletal, type shown at the top of this article, allow one to visually explore the three-dimensional (3D) structure of DNA. Another type of DNA model is the space-filling, or CPK, model.

The hydrogen bonding dynamics and proton exchange is very different by many orders of magnitude between the two systems of fully hydrated DNA and water molecules in ice. Thus, the DNA dynamics is complex, involving nanosecond and several tens of picosecond time scales, whereas that of liquid ice is on the picosecond time scale, and that of proton exchange in ice is on the millisecond time scale. The proton exchange rates in DNA and attached proteins may vary from picosecond to nanosecond, minutes or years, depending on the exact locations of the exchanged protons in the large biopolymers.

A simple harmonic oscillator 'vibration' is only an oversimplified dynamic representation of the longitudinal vibrations of the DNA intertwined helices which were found to be anharmonic rather than harmonic as often assumed in quantum dynamic simulations of DNA.

=== DNA structure ===
The structure of DNA shows a variety of forms, both double-stranded and single-stranded. The mechanical properties of DNA, which are directly related to its structure, are a significant problem for cells. Every process which binds or reads DNA uses or modifies the mechanical properties of DNA for purposes of recognition, packaging, and modification. The extreme length (a chromosome may contain a 10 cm long DNA strand), relative rigidity and helical structure of DNA has led to the evolution of histones and of enzymes such as topoisomerases and helicases to manage a cell's DNA. The properties of DNA are closely related to its molecular structure and sequence, particularly the weakness of the hydrogen bonds and electronic interactions that hold strands of DNA together compared to the strength of the bonds within each strand.

Experimental methods which can directly measure the mechanical properties of DNA are relatively new, and high-resolution visualization in solution is often difficult. Nevertheless, scientists have uncovered large amount of data on the mechanical properties of this polymer, and the implications of DNA's mechanical properties on cellular processes is a topic of active current research.

The DNA found in many cells can be macroscopic in length: a few centimetres long for each human chromosome. Consequently, cells must compact or package DNA to carry it within them. In eukaryotes this is carried by spool-like proteins named histones, around which DNA winds. It is the further compaction of this DNA-protein complex which produces the well known mitotic eukaryotic chromosomes.

In the late 1970s, alternate non-helical models of DNA structure were briefly considered as a potential solution to problems in DNA replication in plasmids and chromatin. However, the models were set aside in favor of the double-helical model due to subsequent experimental advances such as X-ray crystallography of DNA duplexes, and later the nucleosome core particle, and the discovery of topoisomerases. Such non-double-helical models are not currently accepted by the mainstream scientific community.

== DNA structure determination using molecular modeling and DNA X-ray patterns ==
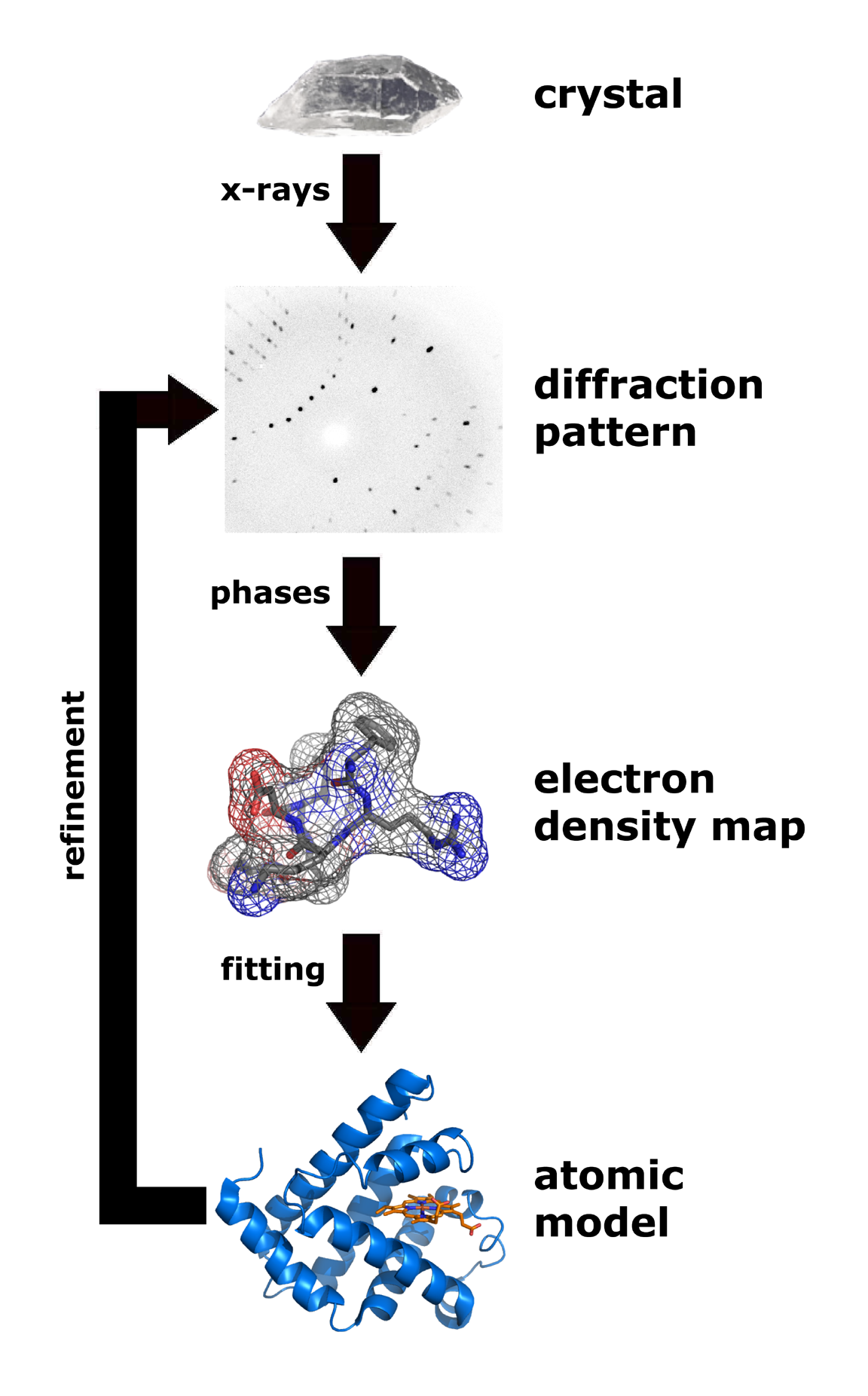
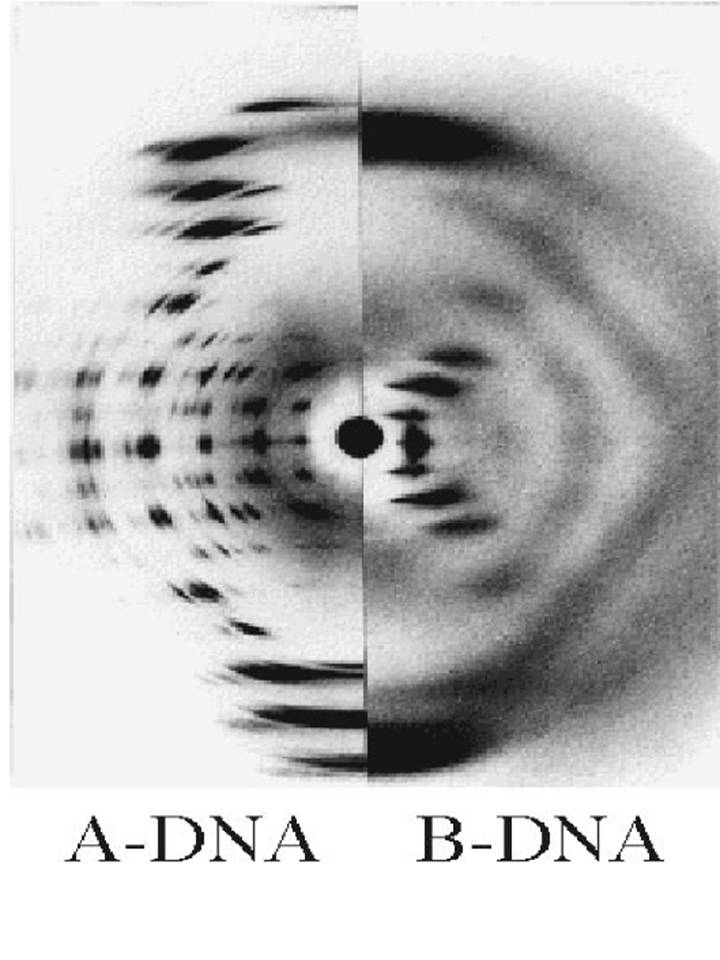
Left, the major steps involved in DNA structure determination by X-ray crystallography showing the important role played by molecular models of DNA structure in this iterative process. Right, an image of actual A- and B- DNA X-ray patterns obtained from oriented and hydrated DNA fibers (courtesy of Dr. Herbert R. Wilson, FRS- see refs. list).

After DNA has been separated and purified by standard biochemical methods, one has a sample in a jar much like in the figure at the top of this article. Below are the main steps involved in generating structural information from X-ray diffraction studies of oriented DNA fibers that are drawn from the hydrated DNA sample with the help of molecular models of DNA that are combined with crystallographic and mathematical analysis of the X-ray patterns.

== Paracrystalline lattice models of B-DNA structures ==
Silica glass is another example of a material which is organized into a paracrystalline lattice.

A paracrystalline lattice, or paracrystal, is a molecular or atomic lattice with significant amounts (e.g., larger than a few percent) of partial disordering of molecular arrangements. Limiting cases of the paracrystal model are nanostructures, such as glasses, liquids, etc., that may possess only local ordering and no global order. A simple example of a paracrystalline lattice is shown in the following figure for a silica glass:

Liquid crystals also have paracrystalline rather than crystalline structures.

Highly hydrated B-DNA occurs naturally in living cells in such a paracrystalline state, which is a dynamic one despite the relatively rigid DNA double helix stabilized by parallel hydrogen bonds between the nucleotide base-pairs in the two complementary, helical DNA chains (see figures). For simplicity most DNA molecular models omit both water and ions dynamically bound to B-DNA, and are thus less useful for understanding the dynamic behaviors of B-DNA in vivo. The physical and mathematical analysis of X-ray and spectroscopic data for paracrystalline B-DNA is thus far more complex than that of crystalline, A-DNA X-ray diffraction patterns. The paracrystal model is also important for DNA technological applications such as DNA nanotechnology. Novel methods that combine X-ray diffraction of DNA with X-ray microscopy in hydrated living cells are now also being developed.

== Genomic and biotechnology applications of DNA molecular modeling ==
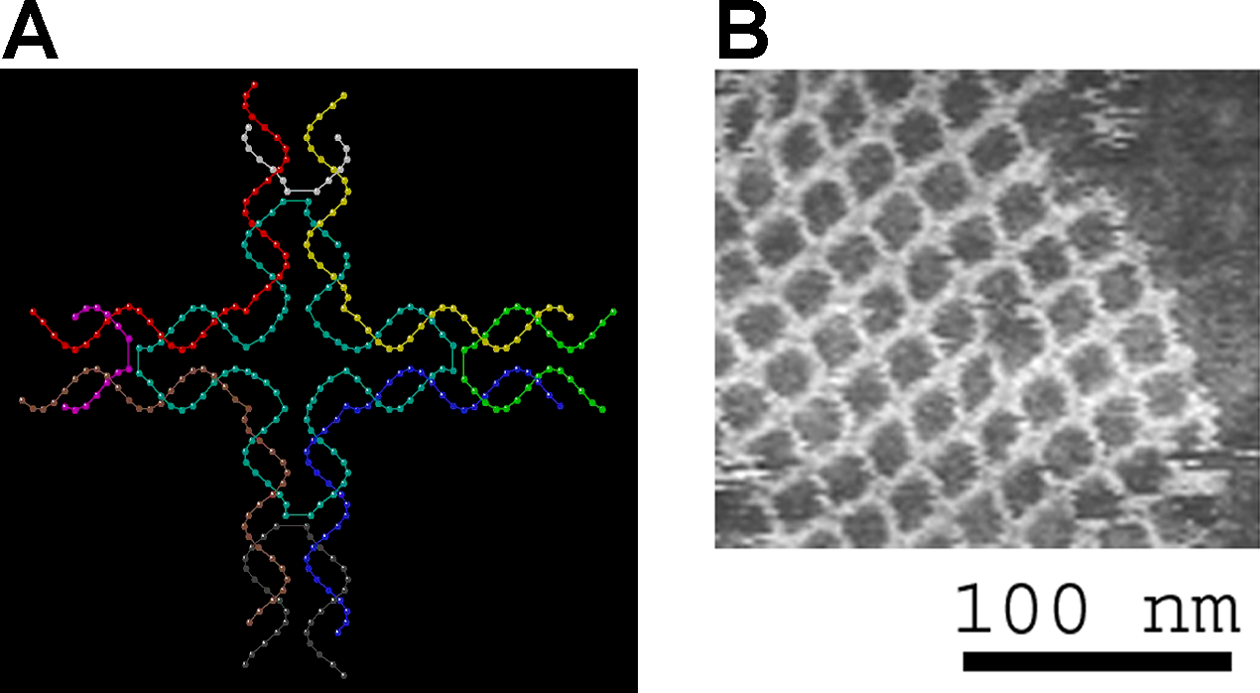
Molecular models are useful in for designing structures for DNA nanotechnology. Here, individual DNA tiles (model at left) self-assemble into a highly ordered DNA 2D-nanogrid (AFM image at right).

There are various uses of DNA molecular modeling in Genomics and Biotechnology research applications, from DNA repair to PCR and DNA nanostructures. Two-dimensional DNA junction arrays have been visualized by atomic force microscopy.

DNA molecular modeling has various uses in genomics and biotechnology, with research applications ranging from DNA repair to PCR and DNA nanostructures. These include computer molecular models of molecules as varied as RNA polymerase, an E. coli, bacterial DNA primase template suggesting very complex dynamics at the interfaces between the enzymes and the DNA template, and molecular models of the mutagenic, chemical interaction of potent carcinogen molecules with DNA. These are all represented in the gallery below.

Technological application include a DNA biochip and DNA nanostructures designed for DNA computing and other dynamic applications of DNA nanotechnology. The image at right is of self-assembled DNA nanostructures. The DNA "tile" structure in this image consists of four branched junctions oriented at 90° angles. Each tile consists of nine DNA oligonucleotides as shown; such tiles serve as the primary "building block" for the assembly of the DNA nanogrids shown in the AFM micrograph.

Quadruplex DNA may be involved in certain cancers. Images of quadruplex DNA are in the gallery below.

== Gallery of DNA models ==
Spinning DNA generic model.

An oversimplified sketch of the double helix structure of A-DNA.

A model of DNA replication based on the double helix concept.

Animated, space-filling molecular model of the B-DNA double helix

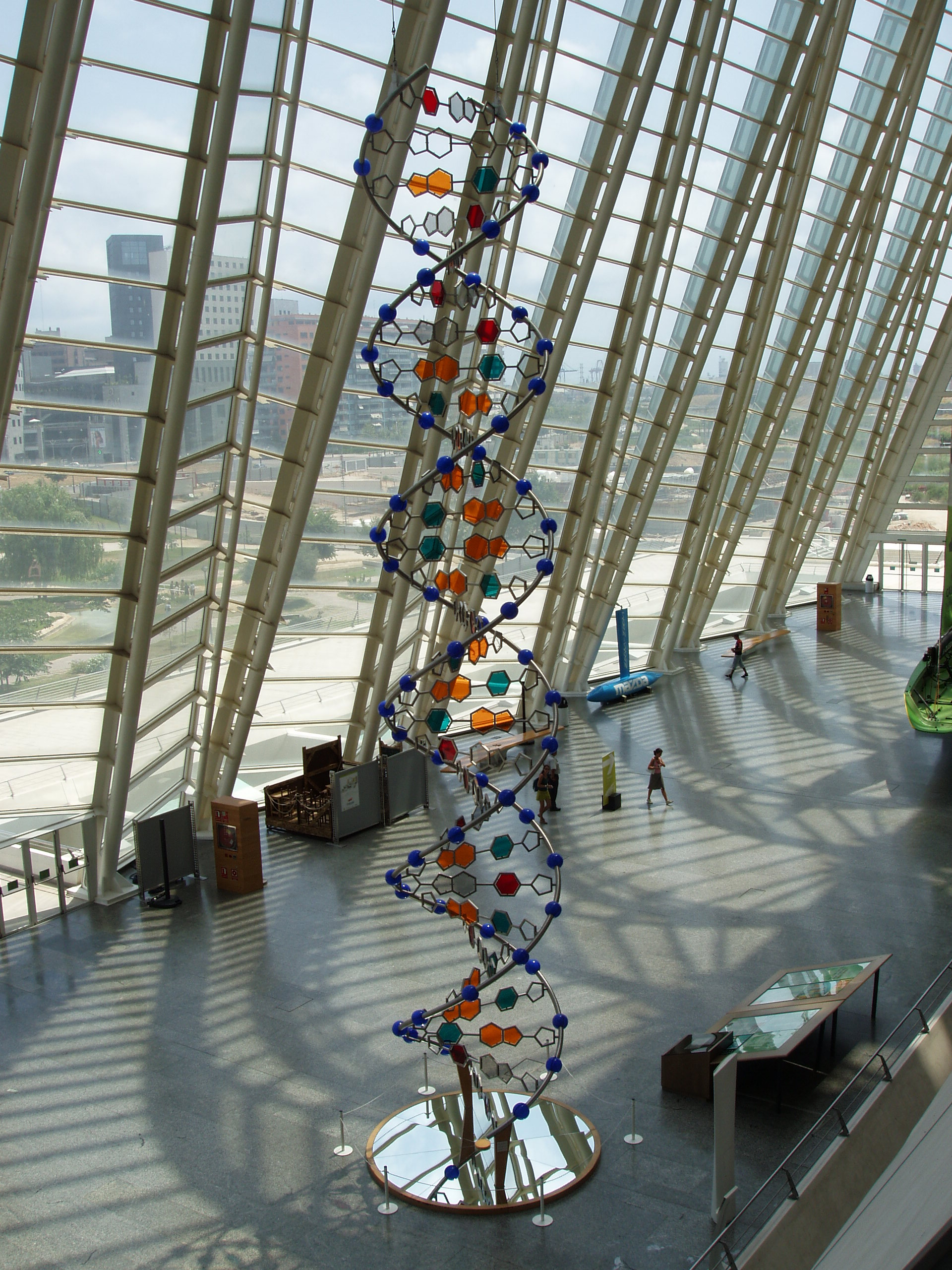
A large-scale Crick-Watson DNA model shown in the Museum of Príncipe Felipe.

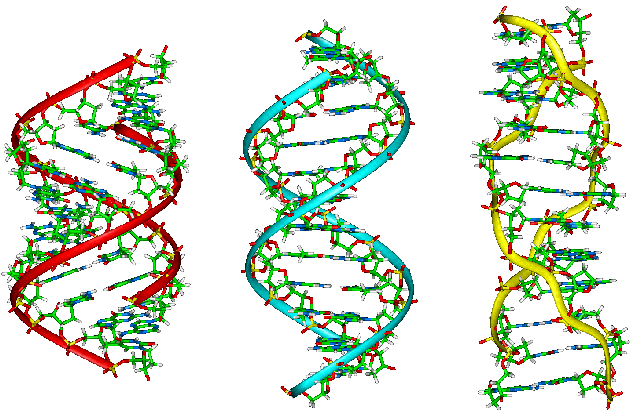
Side view of molecular models of A-, B-, Z- DNA.

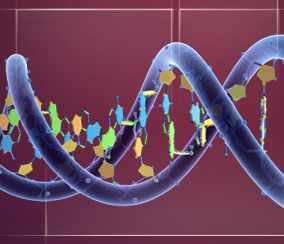
Oversimplified model of the A-DNA double helix.

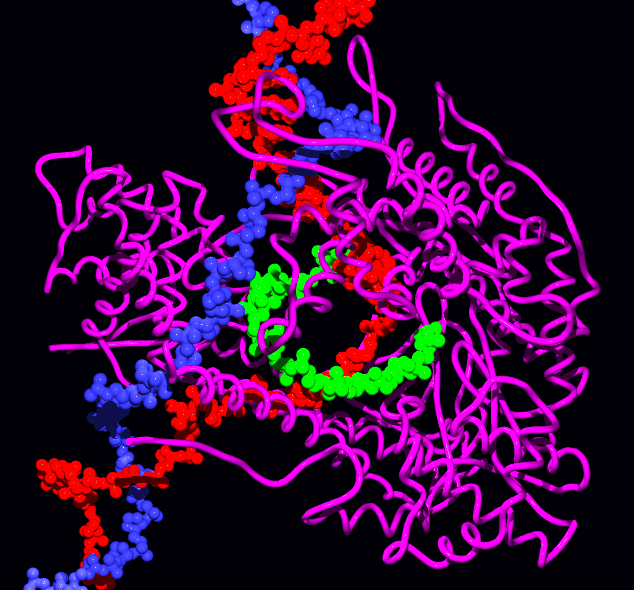
Molecular modeling of RNA polymerase.

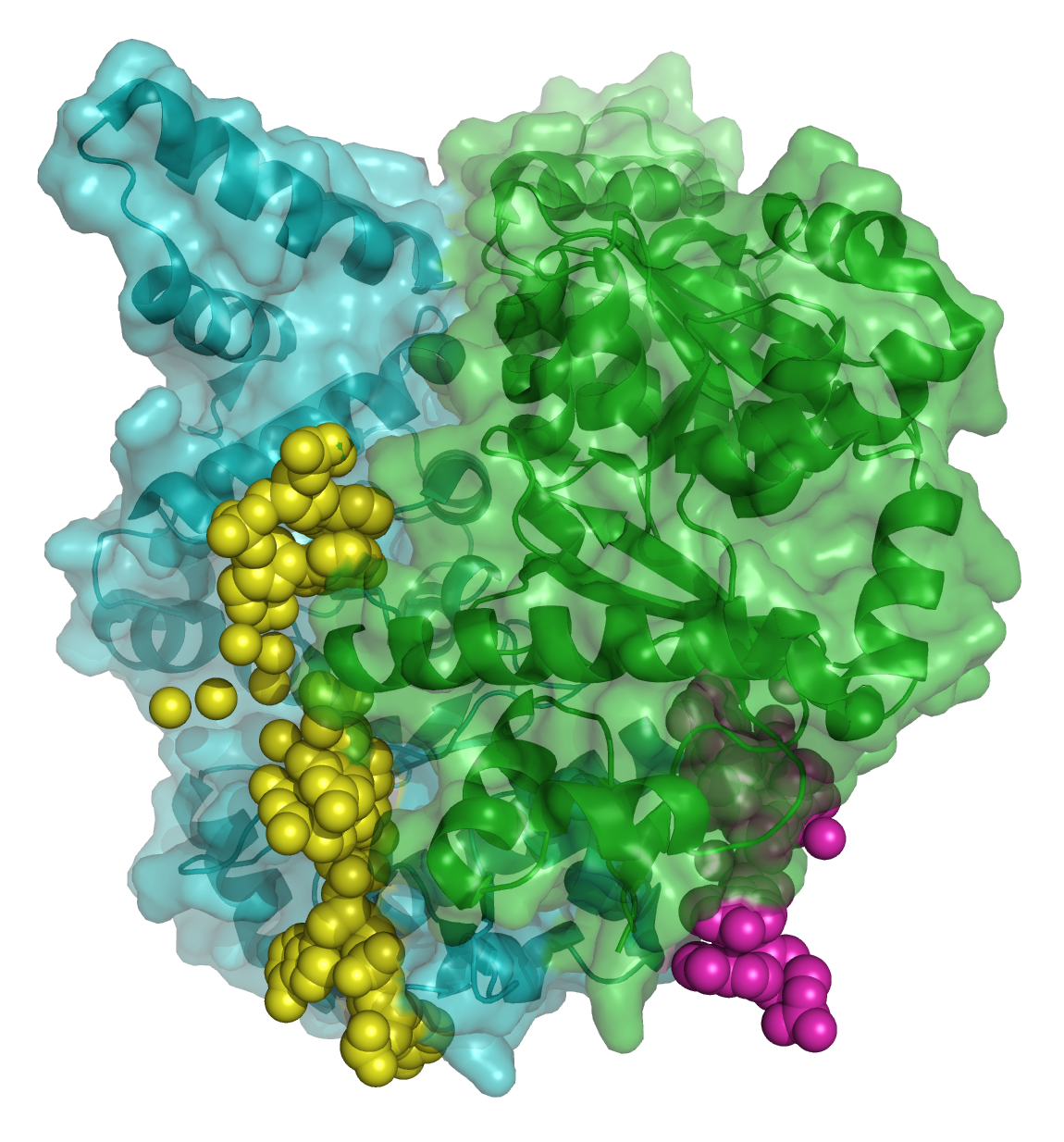
Molecular modeling of a bacterial DNA primase template.

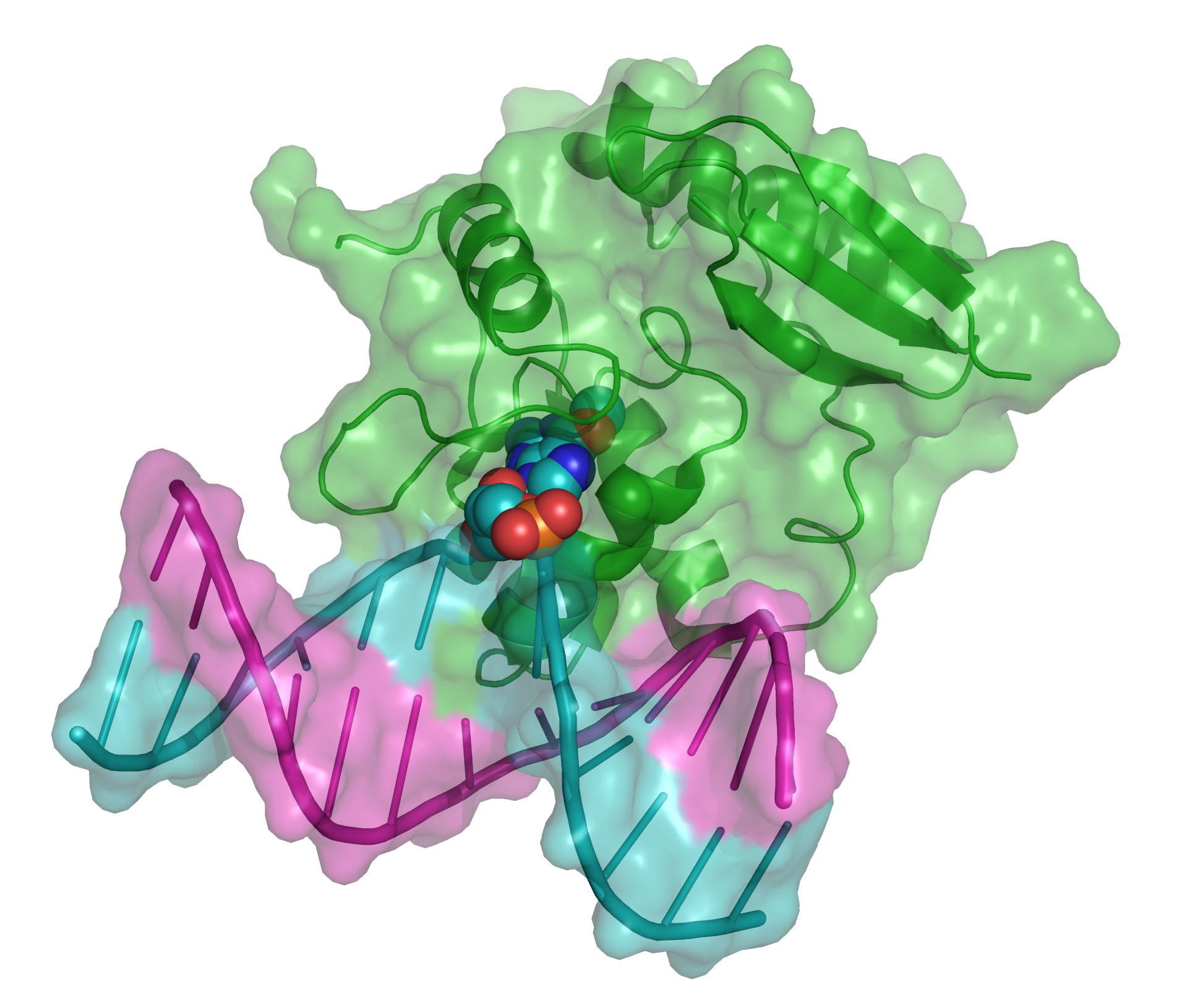
Molecular modeling of DNA interactions with the carcinogen molecule MGMT.

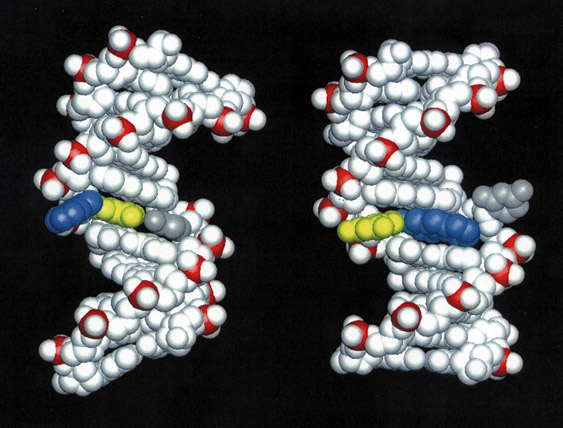
3D Molecular model of DNA damaged by carcinogenic 2-aminofluorene(AF).

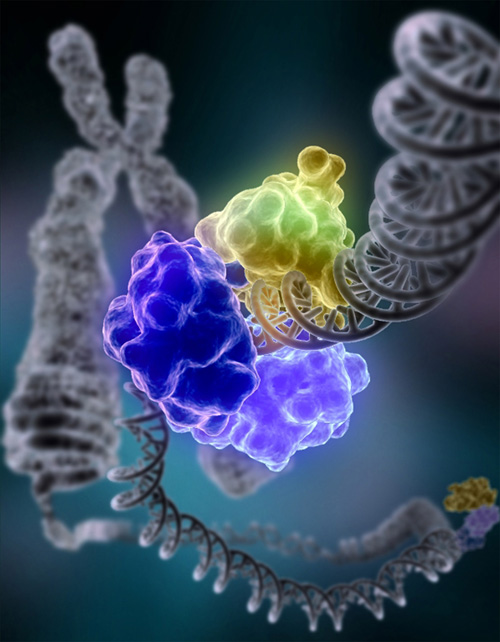
Fig.6. Molecular modeling of DNA repair

Animated skeletal model of A-DNA.

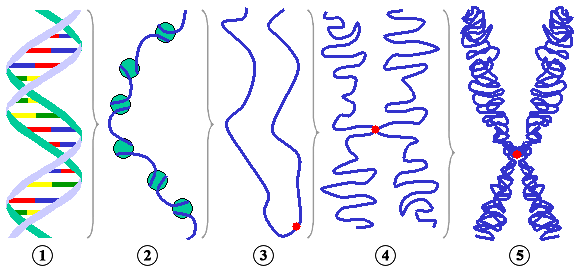
Simplified models of chromatin.

Simplified model of chromosome structure.

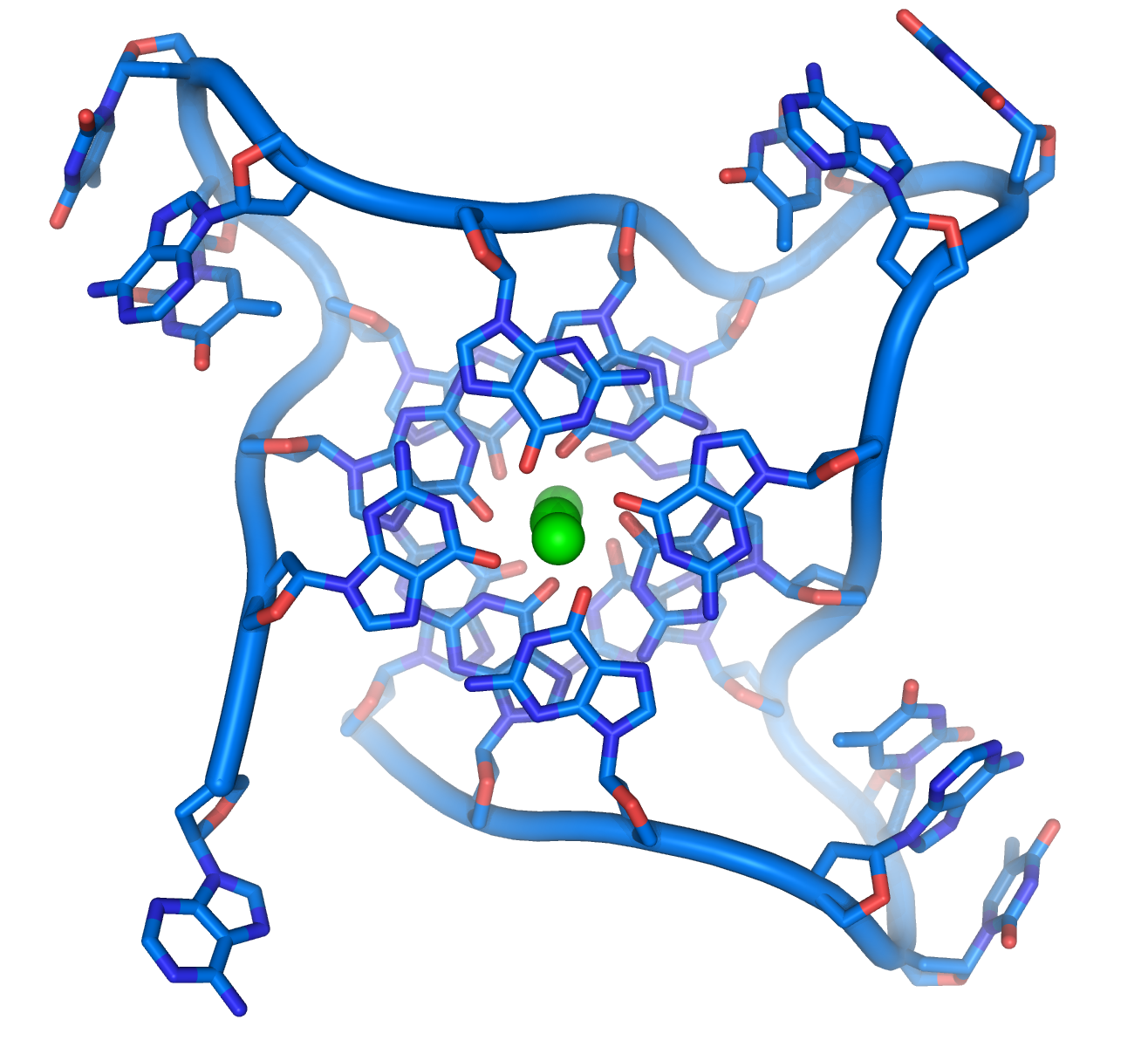
A hypothetical quadruplex of guanine-rich DNA structures that may be involved in cancers.

3D Molecular Structure of the intramolecular human telomeric G-quadruplex in potassium solution.

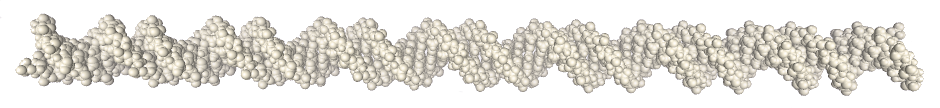
DNA spacefilling molecular model

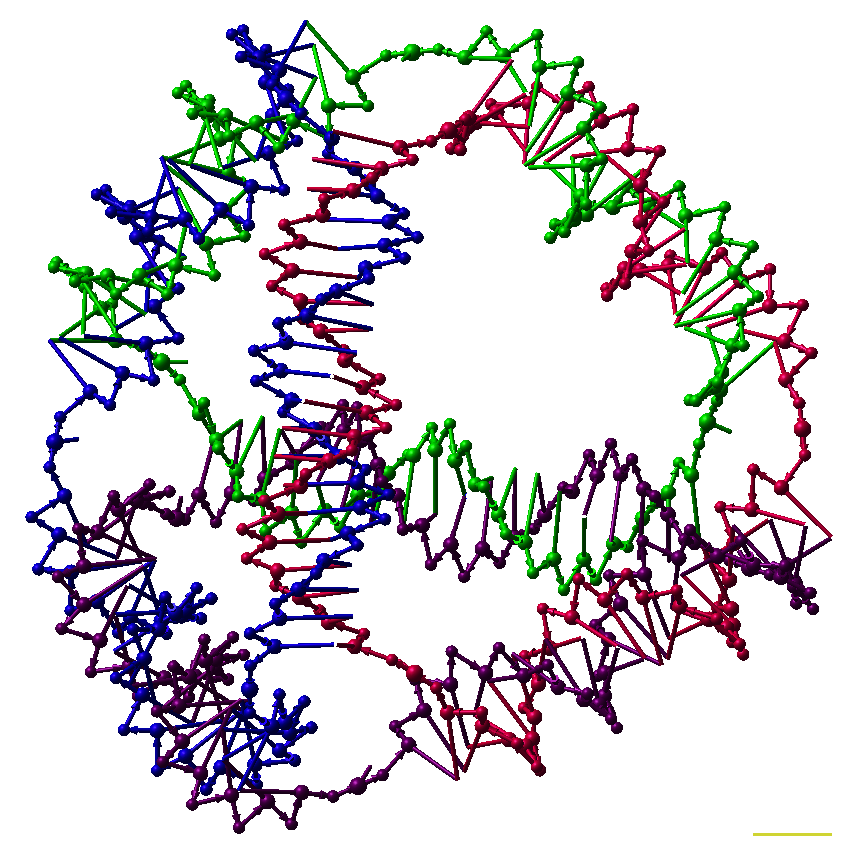
A model of a designed DNA tetrahedron.

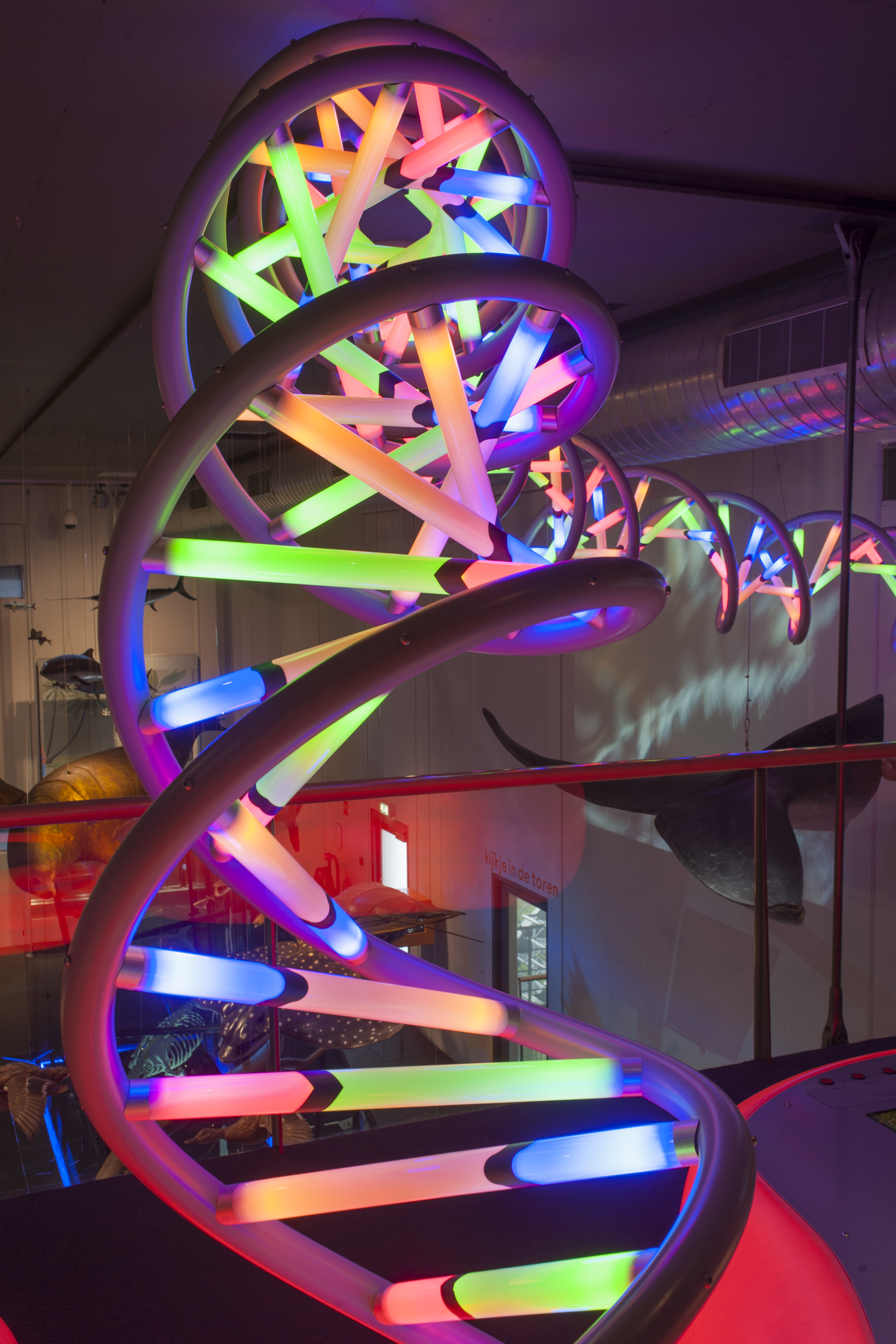
15 m long DNA model, Naturalis Biodiversity Center

== See also ==
- G-quadruplex
- Crystallography
- Crystal lattice
- DiProDB (Dinucleotide Property Database), designed to collect and analyse thermodynamic, structural, and other dinucleotide traits
- X-ray microscope
- X-ray scattering techniques
- Neutron scattering
- Nucleic acid sequence
- Vibrational circular dichroism (VCD)
- Raman spectroscopy-microscopy and coherent anti-Stokes Raman spectroscopy (CARS)
- Sir Lawrence Bragg, FRS
- Comparison of nucleic acid simulation software
- AMBER
- CHARMM
- Abalone (molecular mechanics)
- Sirius visualization software
- QMC@Home
- Nuclear magnetic resonance spectroscopy (FT-NMR)
- Nuclear magnetic resonance imaging microscopy
- Microwave spectroscopy
- FT-infrared (IR)
- FT-near-infrared spectroscopy (NIR)
- Spectral imaging, hyperspectral imaging, chemical imaging
- Fluorescence correlation spectroscopy
- Fluorescence cross-correlation spectroscopy and Förster resonance energy transfer (FRET)
- Confocal microscopy
- Obsolete models of DNA structure
