= Molecular graphics =

Computer graphics

Fullerene C_{60} with isosurface

Molecular graphics is the discipline and philosophy of studying molecules and their properties through graphical representation. IUPAC limits the definition to representations on a "graphical display device". Ever since Dalton's atoms and Kekulé's benzene, there has been a rich history of hand-drawn atoms and molecules, and these representations have had an important influence on modern molecular graphics.

Colour molecular graphics are often used on chemistry journal covers artistically.

== History ==
Prior to the use of computer graphics in representing molecular structure, Robert Corey and Linus Pauling developed a system for representing atoms or groups of atoms from hard wood on a scale of 1 inch = 1 angstrom connected by a clamping device to maintain the molecular configuration. These early models also established the CPK coloring scheme that is still used today to differentiate the different types of atoms in molecular models (e.g. carbon = black, oxygen = red, nitrogen = blue, etc). This early model was improved upon in 1966 by W.L. Koltun and are now known as Corey-Pauling-Koltun (CPK) models.

The earliest efforts to produce models of molecular structure was done by Project MAC using wire-frame models displayed on a cathode ray tube in the mid 1960s. In 1965, Carroll Johnson distributed the Oak Ridge thermal ellipsoid plot (ORTEP) that visualized molecules as a ball-and-stick model with lines representing the bonds between atoms and ellipsoids to represent the probability of thermal motion. Thermal ellipsoid plots quickly became the de facto standard used in the display of X-ray crystallography data, and are still in wide use today. The first practical use of molecular graphics was a simple display of the protein myoglobin using a wireframe representation in 1966 by Cyrus Levinthal and Robert Langridge working at Project MAC.

Among the milestones in high-performance molecular graphics was the work of Nelson Max in "realistic" rendering of macromolecules using reflecting spheres.

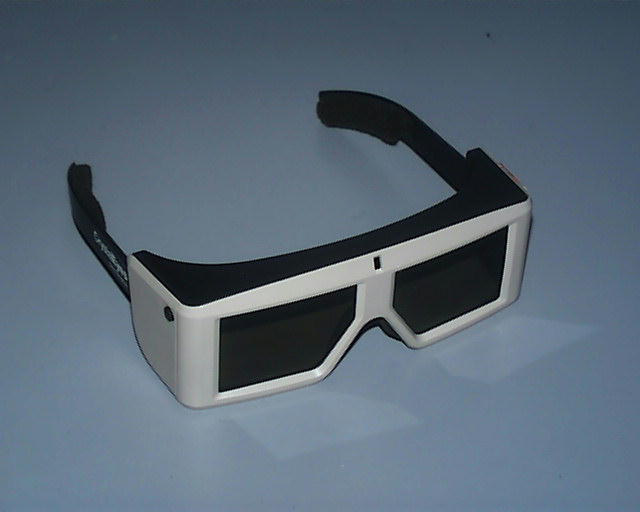
A pair of CrystalEyes shutter glasses

Initially much of the technology concentrated on high-performance 3D graphics. During the 1970s, methods for displaying 3D graphics using cathode ray tubes were developed using continuous tone computer graphics in combination with electro-optic shutter viewing devices. The first devices used an active shutter 3D system, generating different perspective views for the left and right channel to provide the illusion of three-dimensional viewing. Stereoscopic viewing glasses were designed using lead lanthanum zirconate titanate (PLZT) ceramics as electronically controlled shutter elements. Active 3D glasses require batteries and work in concert with the display to actively change the presentation by the lenses to the wearer's eyes. Many modern 3D glasses use a passive, polarized 3D system that enables the wearer to visualize 3D effects based on their own perception. Passive 3D glasses are more common today since they are less expensive.

The requirements of macromolecular crystallography also drove molecular graphics because the traditional techniques of physical model-building could not scale. The first two protein structures solved by molecular graphics without the aid of the Richards' Box were built with Stan Swanson's program FIT on the Vector General graphics display in the laboratory of Edgar Meyer at Texas A&M University: First Marge Legg in Al Cotton's lab at A&M solved a second, higher-resolution structure of staph. nuclease (1975) and then Jim Hogle solved the structure of monoclinic lysozyme in 1976. A full year passed before other graphics systems were used to replace the Richards' Box for modelling into density in 3-D. Alwyn Jones' FRODO program (and later "O") were developed to overlay the molecular electron density determined from X-ray crystallography and the hypothetical molecular structure.

=== Timeline ===
Developer(s)	Approximate date	Technology	Comments
Crystallographers	< 1960	Hand-drawn	Crystal structures, with hidden atom and bond removal. Often clinographic projections.
Johnson, Motherwell	c. 1970	Pen plotter	ORTEP, PLUTO. Very widely deployed for publishing crystal structures.
Cyrus Levinthal, Bob Langridge, Ward, Stots	1966	Project MAC display system, two-degree of freedom, spring-return velocity joystick for rotating the image.	First protein display on screen. System for interactively building protein structures.
Barry	1969	LINC 300 computer with a dual trace oscilloscope display.	Interactive molecular structure viewing system. Early examples of dynamic rotation, intensity depth·cueing, and side-by-side stereo. Early use of the small angle approximations (a = sin a, 1 = cos a) to speed up graphical rotation calculations.
Ortony	1971	Designed a stereo viewer (British patent appl. 13844/70) for molecular computer graphics.	Horizontal two-way (half-silvered) mirror combines images drawn on the upper and lower halves of a CRT. Crossed polarizers isolate the images to each eye.
Ortony	1971	Light pen, knob.	Interactive molecular structure viewing system. Select bond by turning another knob until desired bond lights up in sequence, a technique later used on the MMS-4 system below, or by picking with the light pen. Points in space are specified with a 3-D "bug" under dynamic control.
Barry, Graesser, Marshall	1971	CHEMAST: LINC 300 computer driving an oscilloscope. Two-axis joystick, similar to one used later by GRIP-75 (below).	Interactive molecular structure viewing system. Structures dynamically rotated using the joystick.
Tountas and Katz	1971	Adage AGT/50 display	Interactive molecular structure viewing system. Mathematics of nested rotation and for laboratory-space rotation.
Perkins, Piper, Tattam, White	1971	Honeywell DDP 516 computer, EAL TR48 analog computer, Lanelec oscilloscope, 7 linear potentiometers. Stereo.	Interactive molecular structure viewing system.
Wright	1972	GRIP-71 at UNC-CH: IBM System/360 Model 40 time-shared computer, IBM 2250 display, buttons, light pen, keyboard.	Discrete manipulation and energy relaxation of protein structures. Program code became the foundation of the GRIP-75 system below.
Barry and North	1972	University of Oxford: Ferranti Argus 500 computer, Ferranti model 30 display, keyboard, track ball, one knob. Stereo.	Prototype large-molecule crystallographic structure solution system. Track ball rotates a bond, knob brightens the molecule vs. electron density map.
North, Ford, Watson	Early 1970s	University of Leeds: DEC PDP·11/40 computer, Hewlett-Packard display. 16 knobs, keyboard, spring-return joystick. Stereo.	Prototype large-molecule crystallographic structure solution system. Six knobs rotate and translate a small molecule.
Barry, Bosshard, Ellis, Marshall, Fritch, Jacobi	1974	MMS-4: Washington University in St. Louis, LINC 300 computer and an LDS-1 / LINC 300 display, custom display modules. Rotation joystick, knobs. Stereo.	Prototype large-molecule crystallographic structure solution system. Select bond to rotate by turning another knob until desired bond lights up in sequence.
Cohen and Feldmann	1974	DEC PDP-10 computer, Adage display, push buttons, keyboard, knobs	Prototype large-molecule crystallographic structure solution system.
Stellman	1975	Princeton University: PDP-10 computer, LDS-1 display, knobs	Prototype large-molecule crystallographic structure solution system. Electron density map not shown; instead an "H Factor" figure of merit is updated as the molecular structure is manipulated.
Collins, Cotton, Hazen, Meyer, Morimoto	1975	CRYSNET, Texas A&M Univ. DEC PDP-11/40 computer, Vector General Series 3 display, knobs, keyboard. Stereo.	Prototype large-molecule crystallographic structure solution system. Variety of viewing modes: rocking, spinning, and several stereo display modes.
Cornelius and Kraut	1976 (approx.)	University of California at San Diego: DEC PDP-11/40 emulator (CalData 135), Evans and Sutherland Picture System display, keyboard, 6 knobs. Stereo.	Prototype large-molecule crystallographic structure solution system.
(Yale Univ.)	1976 (approx.)	PIGS: DEC PDP-11/70 computer, Evans and Sutherland Picture System 2 display, data tablet, knobs.	Prototype large-molecule crystallographic structure solution system. The tablet was used for most interactions.
Feldmann and Porter	1976	NIH: DEC PDP—11/70 computer. Evans and Sutherland Picture System 2 display, knobs. Stereo.	Interactive molecular structure viewing system. Intended to display interactively molecular data from the AMSOM – Atlas of Macromolecular Structure on Microfiche.
Rosenberger et al.	1976	MMS-X: Washington University in St. Louis, TI 980B computer, Hewlett-Packard 1321A display, Beehive video terminal, custom display modules, pair of 3-D spring-return joysticks, knobs.	Prototype (and later successful) large-molecule crystallographic structure solution system. Successor to the MMS-4 system above. The 3-D spring-return joysticks either translate and rotate the molecular structure for viewing or a molecular substructure for fitting, mode controlled by a toggle switch.
Britton, Lipscomb, Pique, Wright, Brooks	1977	GRIP-75 at UNC-CH: Time-shared IBM System/360 Model 75 computer, DEC PDP 11/45 computer, Vector General Series 3 display, 3-D movement box from A.M. Noll and 3-D spring return joystick for substructure manipulation, Measurement Systems nested joystick, knobs, sliders, buttons, keyboard, light pen.	First large-molecule crystallographic structure solution.
Jones	1978	FRODO and RING Max Planck Inst., Germany, RING: DEC PDP-11/40 and Siemens 4004 computers, Vector General 3404 display, 6 knobs.	Large-molecule crystallographic structure solution. FRODO may have run on a DEC VAX-780 as a follow-on to RING.
Diamond	1978	Bilder Cambridge, England, DEC PDP-11/50 computer, Evans and Sutherland Picture System display, tablet.	Large-molecule crystallographic structure solution. All input is by data tablet. Molecular structures built on-line with ideal geometry. Later passes stretch bonds with idealization.
Langridge, White, Marshall	Late 1970s	Departmental systems (PDP-11, Tektronix displays or DEC-VT11, e.g. MMS-X)	Mixture of commodity computing with early displays.
Davies, Hubbard	Mid-1980s	CHEM-X, HYDRA	Laboratory systems with multicolor, raster and vector devices (Sigmex, PS300).
Biosym, Tripos, Polygen	Mid-1980s	PS300 and lower cost dumb terminals (VT200, SIGMEX)	Commercial integrated modelling and display packages.
Silicon Graphics, Sun	Late 1980s	IRIS GL (UNIX) workstations	Commodity-priced single-user workstations with stereoscopic display.
EMBL - WHAT IF	1989, 2000	Machine independent	Nearly free, multifunctional, still fully supported, many free servers based on it
Sayle, Richardson	1992, 1993	RasMol, Kinemage	Platform-independent MG.
MDL (van Vliet, Maffett, Adler, Holt)	1995–1998	Chime	proprietary C++; free browser plugin for Mac (OS9) and PCs
MolSoft	1997–present	ICM-Browser	proprietary; free download for Windows, Mac, and Linux.
ChemAxon	1998-	MarvinSketch & MarvinView. MarvinSpace (2005)	proprietary Java applet or stand-alone application.

== Types ==
=== Ball-and-stick models ===
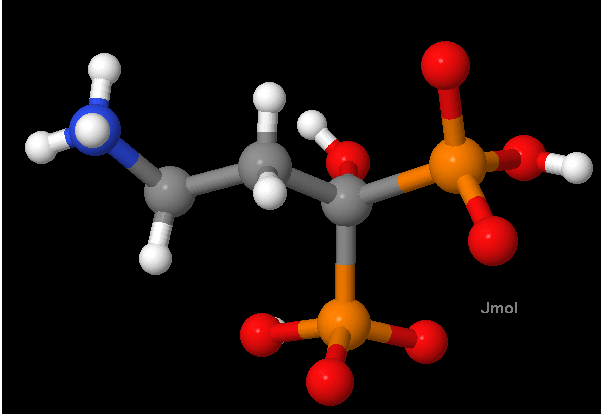
A molecule of pamidronic acid, as drawn by the Jmol program. Hydrogen is white, carbon is grey, nitrogen is blue, oxygen is red, and phosphorus is orange.

In the ball-and-stick model, atoms are drawn as small sphered connected by rods representing the chemical bonds between them.

=== Space-filling models ===
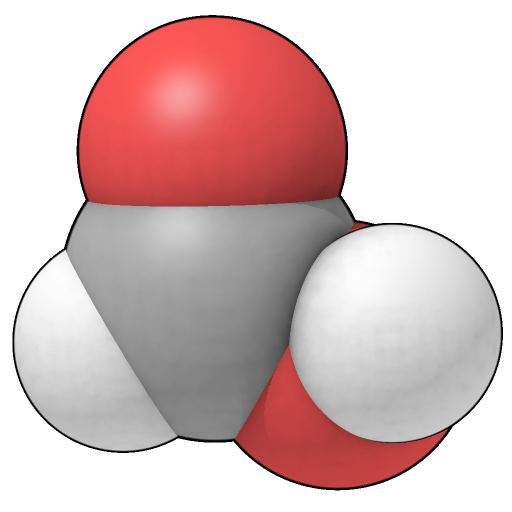
Space-filling model of formic acid. Hydrogen is white, carbon is gray, and oxygen is red.

In the space-filling model, atoms are drawn as solid spheres to suggest the space they occupy, in proportion to their van der Waals radii. Atoms that share a bond overlap with each other.

=== Surfaces ===
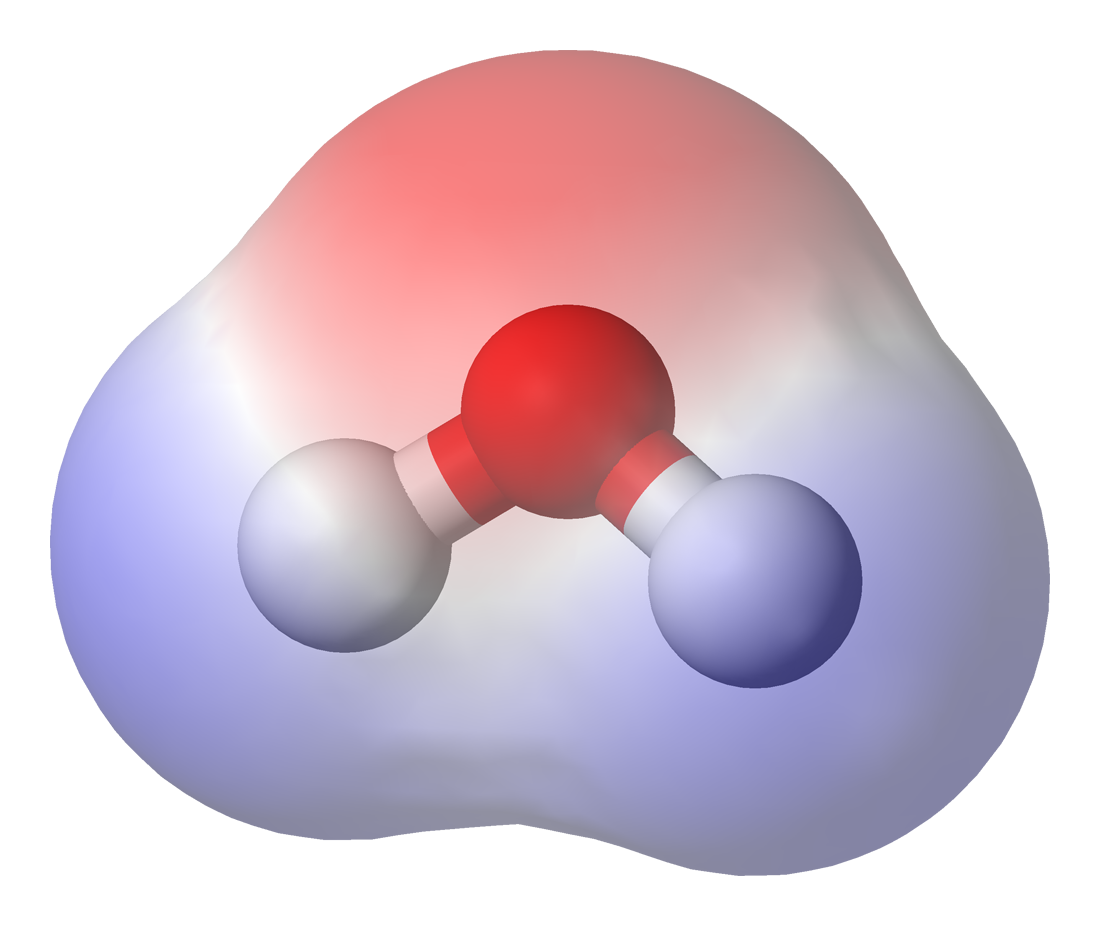
A water molecule drawn with a shaded electrostatic potential isosurface. The areas highlighted in red have a net positive charge density, and the blue areas have a negative charge.

In some models, the surface of the molecule is approximated and shaded to represent a physical property of the molecule, such as electronic charge density.

=== Ribbon diagrams ===
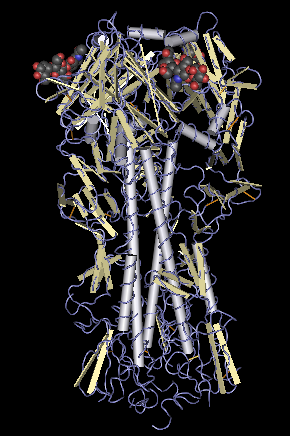
Image of hemagglutinin with alpha helices depicted as cylinders and the rest of the polypeptide as silver coils. The individual atoms of the polypeptide have been hidden. All of the non-hydrogen atoms in the two ligands are shown near the top of the diagram.

Ribbon diagrams are schematic representations of protein structure and are one of the most common methods of protein depiction used today. The ribbon shows the overall path and organization of the protein backbone in 3D, and serves as a visual framework on which to hang details of the full atomic structure, such as the balls for the oxygen atoms bound to the active site of myoglobin in the adjacent image. Ribbon diagrams are generated by interpolating a smooth curve through the polypeptide backbone. α-helices are shown as coiled ribbons or thick tubes, β-strands as arrows, and non-repetitive coils or loops as lines or thin tubes. The direction of the polypeptide chain is shown locally by the arrows, and may be indicated overall by a colour ramp along the length of the ribbon.

== See also ==
- Molecular model – Physical model for representing molecules
  - Ball-and-stick model – Representation of a molecule's bonds and 3D structure
  - Space-filling model – Type of 3D molecular model
- Molecular modelling – Discovering chemical properties by physical simulations
- Molecular geometry – Study of the 3D shapes of molecules
- Molecule editor – Program for simulating chemical structures
- Software
  - Molecular graphics software
  - Molecular mechanics modeling software
  - Molecular design software
- Structural formula – Graphic representation of a molecular structure
