= André Dreiding =

Swiss chemist (1919–2013)

André S. Dreiding (22 June 1919 in Zürich – 24 December 2013 in Herrliberg near Zurich) was a Swiss chemist. He finished his high school studies in Zürich and then studied at Columbia University in New York, where he was awarded BS and MS degrees. After two years as a research assistant at Hoffmann-La Roche, he continued postgraduate studies at the University of Michigan in Ann Arbor under professor Werner Emmanuel Bachmann and was awarded his PhD in 1947. He remained at the university until 1949 as Rackham and Lloyd Postdoctoral Fellow. From 1949 to 1954, Dreiding was an assistant professor at Wayne University, Detroit Institute of Cancer Research. He also temporarily took over Bachmann's teaching and research duties at the University of Michigan after Bachmann's death in 1951 and held them until 1952. In 1954, Dreiding turned to Switzerland and the University of Zurich, where he became professor and stayed until his retirement in 1987, after which he was an emeritus professor.

== Dreiding Stereomodels ==
In 1958, Dreiding invented a molecular model, used primarily in stereochemistry, named the Dreiding Stereomodel. It was a so-called skeletal model, consisting of slim stainless steel tubes and rods. Unlike the older ball-and-stick models, the atoms were not represented by a ball but rather by the point of intersection of the steel tubes. The intersection area was painted with a color to indicate the atom's identity . As the tubes represented the bonds, the model focused on the geometry of the bonds between atoms rather than the atoms themselves. The Dreiding Stereomodel was not the first skeletal model, but was the first to do away with the connectors used in, e.g. John Kendrew's earlier protein models. Instead, the Dreiding Stereomodels used a valency of the bonds/steel tubes to facilitate connections; they were either a hollow tube or a slightly narrower solid rod which fit into the tube. A tube not connected to another tube represented a hydrogen atom and the bond from the other atom (for example carbon, oxygen or nitrogen) to the hydrogen atoms. This gave the Dreiding Stereomodels a neat look and made the assembly much quicker than earlier skeletal models. They were also quite precise in representing the molecular geometry, so rulers could be used to determine inter-atomic distances and angles.

== Availability of Dreiding Stereomodels ==
The Dreiding Stereomodels were primarily used as a research tool rather than an educational tool for undergraduates. They were widely used by organic chemists, stereochemists and natural products chemists in universities and other research laboratories. The models were sold by Büchi in Europe and by Aldrich in North America. A simpler and cheaper plastic version was later introduced, intended for educational purposes, but never became as widely spread as the original steel version. When molecular modeling software became more readily available in the 1990s, the use of Dreiding Stereomodels declined, production stopped, and the models were discontinued around 2005. However, especially for spectroscopic structure elucidation using NMR and MS, the availability of "hands-on" accurate molecular models remains very valuable. E.g., in natural products chemistry, where structures are often elucidated ab initio, Dreiding Stereomodels can be extremely useful as they allow the rapid assembly of alternative and closely related structures with high geometric precision (e.g., for NOE or 2D NMR interpretations). Because of their widespread use and availability for >40 years, many researchers and departments still maintain and use their collections. In order to ease the general supply problem for spare parts or entire models, the Dreiding Model Exchange was established in 2010 at the University of Illinois at Chicago.
