= Space-filling model =

Type of 3D molecular model

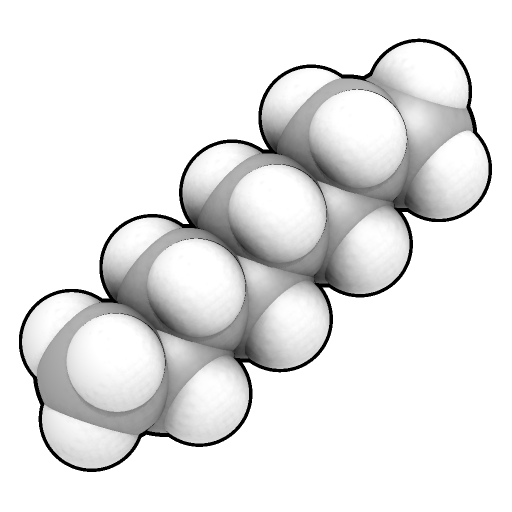
A space-filling model of n-octane, the straight chain (normal) hydrocarbon composed of 8 carbons and 18 hydrogens, formulae: CH_{3}CH_{2}(CH_{2})_{4}CH_{2}CH_{3} or C_{8}H_{18}. Note, the representative shown is of a single conformational "pose" of a population of molecules, which, because of low Gibbs energy barriers to rotation about its carbon-carbon bonds (giving the carbon "chain" great flexibility), normally is composed of a very large number of different such conformations (e.g., in solution).

An example of a three-dimensional, space-filling model of a complex molecule, THC, the active agent in marijuana.

In chemistry, a space-filling model, also known as a calotte model, is a type of three-dimensional (3D) molecular model where the atoms are represented by spheres whose radii are proportional to the radii of the atoms and whose center-to-center distances are proportional to the distances between the atomic nuclei, all in the same scale. Atoms of different chemical elements are usually represented by spheres of different colors.

Space-filling calotte models are also referred to as CPK models after the chemists Robert Corey, Linus Pauling, and Walter Koltun, who over a span of time developed the modeling concept into a useful form. They are distinguished from other 3D representations, such as the ball-and-stick and skeletal models, by the use of the "full size" space-filling spheres for the atoms. The models are tactile and manually rotatable. They are useful for visualizing the effective shape and relative dimensions of a molecule, and (because of the rotatability) the shapes of the surface of the various conformers. On the other hand, these models mask the chemical bonds between the atoms, and make it difficult to see the structure of the molecule that is obscured by the atoms nearest to the viewer in a particular pose. For this reason, such models are of greater utility if they can be used dynamically, especially when used with complex molecules (e.g., see the greater understanding of the molecules shape given when the THC model is clicked on to rotate).

== History ==
Space-filling models arise out of a desire to represent molecules in ways that reflect the electronic surfaces that molecules present, that dictate how they interact, one with another (or with surfaces, or macromolecules such as enzymes, etc.). Crystallographic data are the starting point for understanding static molecular structure, and these data contain the information rigorously required to generate space-filling representations (e.g., see these crystallographic models); most often, however, crystallographers present the locations of atoms derived from crystallography via "thermal ellipsoids" whose cut-off parameters are set for convenience both to show the atom locations (with anisotropies), and to allow representation of the covalent bonds or other interactions between atoms as lines. In short, for reasons of utility, crystallographic data historically have appeared in presentations closer to ball-and-stick models. Hence, while crystallographic data contain the information to create space-filling models, it remained for individuals interested in modeling an effective static shape of a molecule, and the space it occupied, and the ways in which it might present a surface to another molecule, to develop the formalism shown above.

In 1952, Robert Corey and Linus Pauling described accurate scale models of molecules which they had built at Caltech. In their models, they envisioned the surface of the molecule as being determined by the van der Waals radius of each atom of the molecule, and crafted atoms as hardwood spheres of diameter proportional to each atom's van der Waals radius, in the scale 1 inch = 1 Å. To allow bonds between atoms a portion of each sphere was cut away to create a pair of matching flat faces, with the cuts dimensioned so that the distance between sphere centers was proportional to the lengths of standard types of chemical bonds. A connector was designed—a metal bushing that threaded into each sphere at the center of each flat face. The two spheres were then firmly held together by a metal rod inserted into the pair of opposing bushing (with fastening by screws). The models also had special features to allow representation of hydrogen bonds.

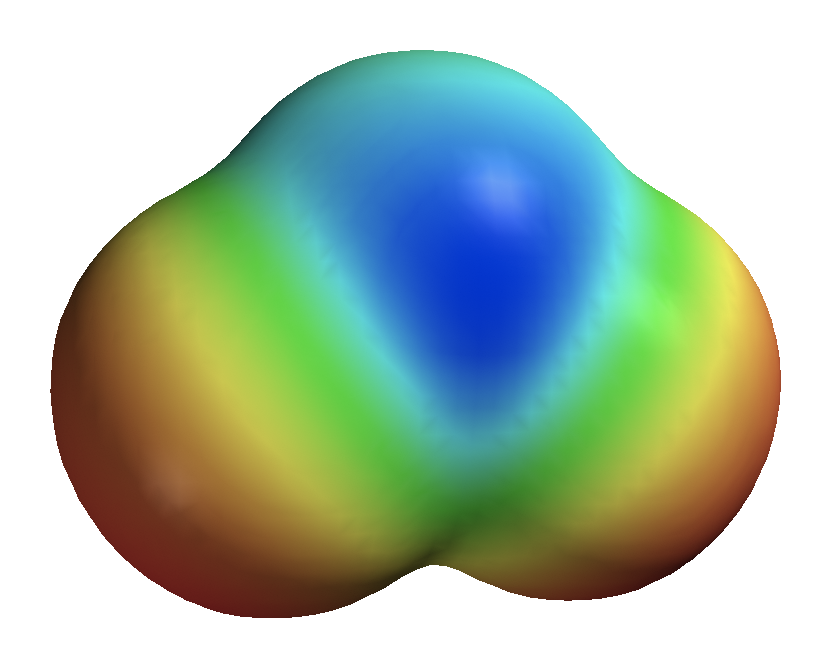
An example of a 3D, space-filling model of a simple molecule, sulfur dioxide, SO_{2}, showing the electrostatic potential surface, computed for the molecule using the Spartan software suite of computational chemistry tools. It is shaded from blue for electropositive areas to red for electronegative areas. The surface was generated by calculating the energy of interaction of a spherical point positive charge (e.g., a proton, H^{+,}) with the molecule's atoms and bonding electrons, in a series of discrete computational steps. Here, the electrostatic surface emphasizes the electron deficiency of the sulfur atom, suggesting interactions in which it might engage, and chemical reactions it might undergo.

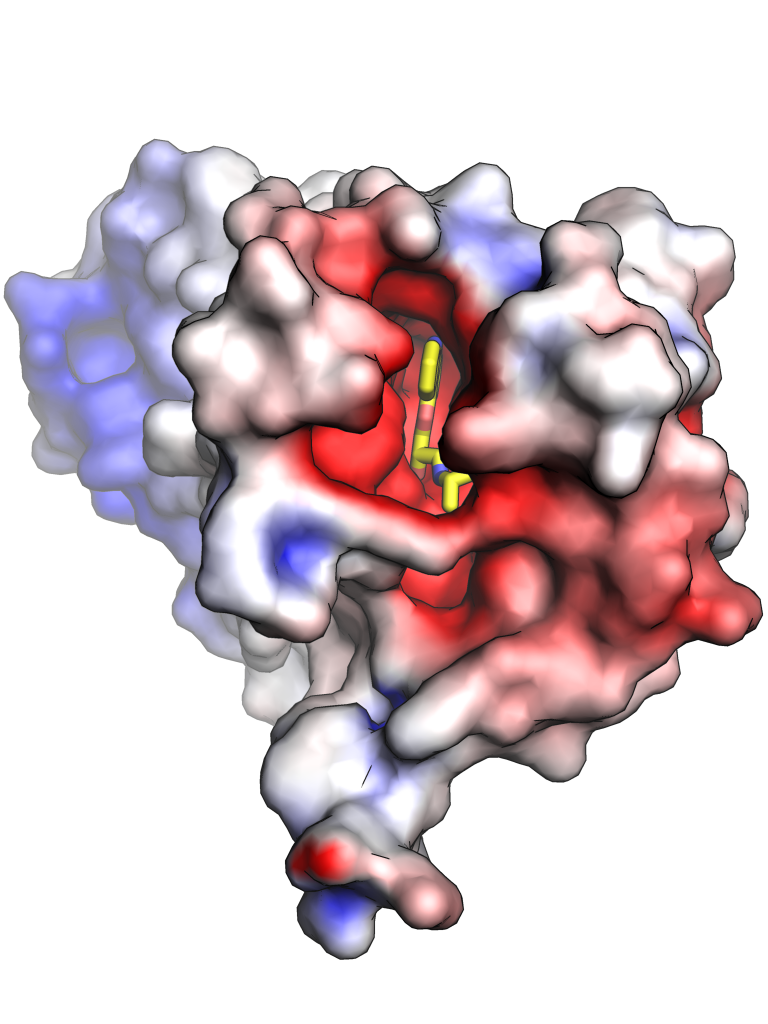
An example of a 3D, space-filling model of a very complex macromolecule, a protein, the cell membrane-spanning β2 adrenoreceptor, a G protein-coupled receptor, in this image, viewed as if looking down onto the extracellular surface. The electrostatic potential surface was applied to a model with atom positions determined by crystallography (PDB code 2RH1); the electrostatic surface was computed using Adaptive Poisson-Boltzmann Solver (APBS) freeware. It is again shaded blue for electropositive areas to red for electronegative areas. Somewhat apparent, in stick representation in yellow, red and blue, in a groove at the top of the receptor, is a small molecule ligand bound to it, the agent carazolol, a partial inverse agonist which, through this binding, antagonizes binding of the normal ligand, the neurotransmitter/hormone epinephrine. In response to binding epinephrine, this receptor, in conjunction with an L-type calcium channel, mediates physiologic responses such as smooth muscle relaxation and bronchodilation. All of such binding interactions and the function of the receptor in signal transduction are mediated by electrostatic effects, and in modern structure work they are often studied using similar space filling models.

In 1965, Walter L. Koltun designed and patented a simplified system with molded plastic atoms of various colours, which were joined by specially designed snap connectors; this simpler system accomplished essentially the same ends as the Corey-Pauling system, and allowed for the development of the models as a popular way of working with molecules in training and research environments. Such colour-coded, bond length-defined, van der Waals-type space-filling models are now commonly known as CPK models, after these three developers of the specific concept.

In modern research efforts, attention returned to use of data-rich crystallographic models in combination with traditional and new computational methods to provide space-filling models of molecules, both simple and complex, where added information such as which portions of the surface of the molecule were readily accessible to solvent, or how the electrostatic characteristics of a space-filling representation—which in the CPK case is almost fully left to the imagination—could be added to the visual models created. The two closing images give examples of the latter type of calculation and representation, and its utility.

== See also ==
- Ball-and-stick model – Representation of a molecule's bonds and 3D structure
- Van der Waals surface – Molecule interaction model
- CPK coloring – Colour convention for differentiating atoms
- Molecular graphics – Computer graphics
- Software for molecular modeling
- Molecular design software – CAD software for molecular-level engineering, modelling, and analysis
- Structural formula – Graphic representation of a molecular structure

== Gallery ==
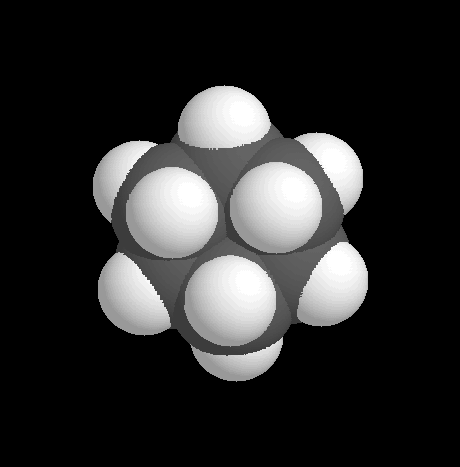
A space-filling model of cyclohexane C_{6}H_{12}. Carbon atoms, partially masked, are in grey, and hydrogen atoms are presented as white spheres.
