= Molecular model =

Physical model for representing molecules

A molecular model is a physical model of an atomistic system that represents molecules and their processes. They play an important role in understanding chemistry and generating and testing hypotheses. The creation of mathematical models of molecular properties and behavior is referred to as molecular modeling, and their graphical depiction is referred to as molecular graphics.

The term, "molecular model" refer to systems that contain one or more explicit atoms (although solvent atoms may be represented implicitly) and where nuclear structure is neglected. The electronic structure is often also omitted unless it is necessary in illustrating the function of the molecule being modeled.

Molecular models may be created for several reasons – as pedagogic tools for students or those unfamiliar with atomistic structures; as objects to generate or test theories (e.g., the structure of DNA); as analogue computers (e.g., for measuring distances and angles in flexible systems); or as aesthetically pleasing objects on the boundary of art and science.

The construction of physical models is often a creative act, and many bespoke examples have been carefully created in the workshops of science departments. There is a very wide range of approaches to physical modeling, including ball-and-stick models available for purchase commercially, to molecular models created using 3D printers. The main strategy, initially in textbooks and research articles and more recently on computers. Molecular graphics has made the visualization of molecular models on computer hardware easier, more accessible, and inexpensive, although physical models are widely used to enhance the tactile and visual message being portrayed.

== History ==
In the 1600s, Johannes Kepler speculated on the symmetry of snowflakes and the close packing of spherical objects such as fruit. The symmetrical arrangement of closely packed spheres informed theories of molecular structure in the late 1800s, and many theories of crystallography and solid state inorganic structure used collections of equal and unequal spheres to simulate packing and predict structure.

John Dalton represented compounds as aggregations of circular atoms, and although Johann Josef Loschmidt did not create physical models, his diagrams based on circles are two-dimensional analogues of later models.

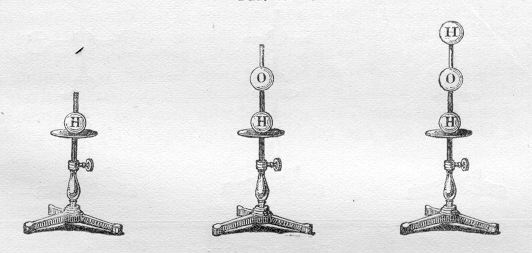
Hofmann's croquet set illustrating how molecules are constructed

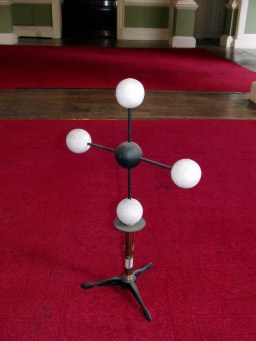
Hofmann's model for methane, now known to depict an incorrect geometry

August Wilhelm von Hofmann is credited with the first physical molecular model around 1860. The surviving model of methane is from his Friday Evening Discourse on 7th April 1865 at the Royal Institution, where he used croquet balls to illustrate different chemical structures:

Thus we distinguish the chlorine atom as univalent, the atom of oxygen as bivalent, that of nitrogen as trivalent, and lastly the carbon atom as quadrivalent. - this I believe I can show you by a very simple contrivance. I will on this occasion, with your permission, select my illustration from that most delightful of games croquet. Let the croquet balls represent our atoms, and let us distinguish the atoms of different elements by different colours. The white balls are hydrogen, the green ones chlorine atoms; the atoms of fiery oxygen are red, those of nitrogen, blue; the carbons atoms, lastly, are naturally represented by black balls. But we have, in addition, to exhibit the different combining powers of these atoms. This we accomplish by screwing into the balls a number of metallic arms (tubes and pins), which correspond respectively to the combining powers of the atoms represented, and which, while constituting an additional feature of distinction, enable us at the same time to join the balls and to rear in this manner a kind of mechanical structures in imitation of the atomic edifices to be illustrated."

Hofmann used this as a illustrative model, rather than a representation of reality: the sticks do not represent physical bonds, nor the actual molecule being planar.

The importance of stereochemistry was not then recognised and the model is essentially topological (it should be a 3-dimensional tetrahedron).

Jacobus Henricus van 't Hoff and Joseph Le Bel introduced the concept of chemistry in three dimensions of space, that is, stereochemistry. Van 't Hoff built tetrahedral molecules representing the three-dimensional properties of carbon.

== Models based on spheres ==
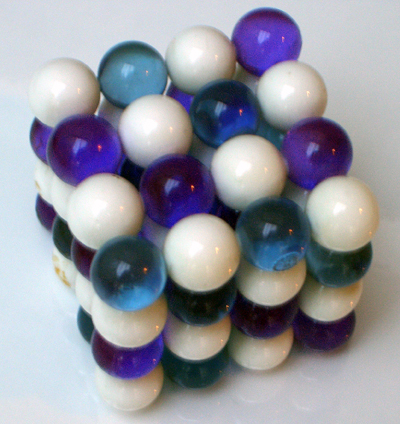
Sodium chloride (NaCl) lattice, showing close-packed spheres representing a face-centered cubic AB lattice similar to that of NaCl and most other alkali halides. In this model the spheres are equal sizes whereas more "realistic" models would have different radii for cations and anions.

Repeating units will help to show how easy it is and clear it is to represent molecules through balls that represent atoms.

The binary compounds sodium chloride (NaCl) and caesium chloride (CsCl) have cubic structures but have different space groups. This can be rationalised in terms of close packing of spheres of different sizes. For example, NaCl can be described as close-packed chloride ions (in a face-centered cubic lattice) with sodium ions in the octahedral holes. After the development of X-ray crystallography as a tool for determining crystal structures, many laboratories built models based on spheres. With the development of plastic or polystyrene balls it is now easy to create such models.

== Models based on ball-and-stick ==
The concept of the chemical bond as a direct link between atoms can be modelled by linking balls (atoms) with sticks/rods (bonds). This has been extremely popular and is still widely used today. Initially atoms were made of spherical wooden balls with specially drilled holes for rods. Thus carbon can be represented as a sphere with four holes at the tetrahedral angles cos^{−1}(−1/3) ≈ 109.47°.

A problem with rigid bonds and holes is that systems with arbitrary angles could not be built. This can be overcome with flexible bonds, originally helical springs but now usually plastic. This also allows double and triple bonds to be approximated by multiple single bonds.

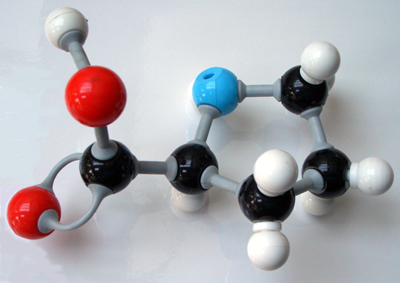
A modern plastic ball and stick model. The molecule shown is proline

The model shown above represents a ball-and-stick model of proline. The balls have colours: black represents carbon (C); red, oxygen (O); blue, nitrogen (N); and white, hydrogen (H). Each ball is drilled with as many holes as its conventional valence (C: 4; N: 3; O: 2; H: 1) directed towards the vertices of a tetrahedron. Single bonds are represented by (fairly) rigid grey rods. Double and triple bonds use two longer flexible bonds which restrict rotation and support conventional cis/trans stereochemistry.

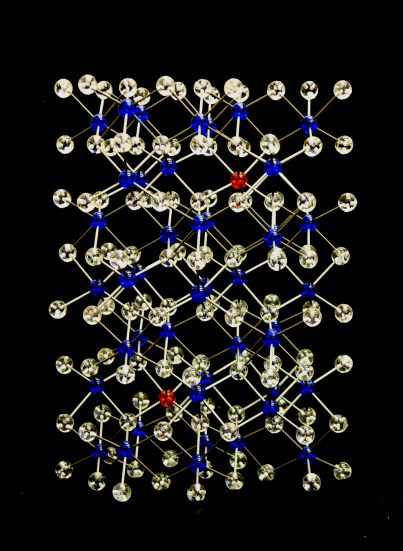
Beever's ball and stick model of ruby (Cr-doped corundum) made with acrylic balls and stainless steel rods

However, most molecules require holes at other angles and specialist companies manufacture kits and bespoke models. Besides tetrahedral, trigonal and octahedral holes, there were all-purpose balls with 24 holes. These models allowed rotation about the single rod bonds, which could be both an advantage (showing molecular flexibility) and a disadvantage (models are floppy). The approximate scale was 5 cm per ångström (0.5 m/nm or 500,000,000:1), but was not consistent over all elements.

Arnold Beevers in Edinburgh created small models using PMMA balls and stainless steel rods. By using individually drilled balls with precise bond angles and bond lengths in these models, large crystal structures to be accurately created, but with light and rigid form. Figure 4 shows a unit cell of ruby in this style.

== Skeletal models ==
Crick and Watson's DNA model and the protein-building kits of Kendrew were among the first skeletal models. These were based on atomic components where the valences were represented by rods; the atoms were points at the intersections. Bonds were created by linking components with tubular connectors with locking screws.

André Dreiding introduced a molecular modelling kit in the late 1950s which dispensed with the connectors. A given atom would have solid and hollow valence spikes. The solid rods clicked into the tubes forming a bond, usually with free rotation. These were and are very widely used in organic chemistry departments and were made so accurately that interatomic measurements could be made by ruler.

More recently, inexpensive plastic models (such as Orbit) use a similar principle. A small plastic sphere has protuberances onto which plastic tubes can be fitted. The flexibility of the plastic means that distorted geometries can be made.

== Polyhedral models ==
Many inorganic solids consist of atoms surrounded by a coordination sphere of electronegative atoms (e.g. PO_{4} tetrahedra, TiO_{6} octahedra). Structures can be modelled by gluing together polyhedra made of paper or plastic.

== Composite models ==
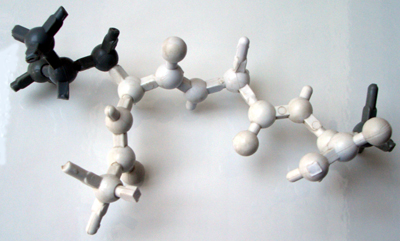
A Nicholson model, showing a short part of protein backbone (white) with side chains (grey). Note the snipped stubs representing hydrogen atoms.

A good example of composite models is the Nicholson approach, widely used from the late 1970s for building models of biological macromolecules. The components are primarily amino acids and nucleic acids with preformed residues representing groups of atoms. Many of these atoms are directly moulded into the template, and fit together by pushing plastic stubs into small holes. The plastic grips well and makes bonds difficult to rotate, so that arbitrary torsion angles can be set and retain their value. The conformations of the backbone and side chains are determined by pre-computing the torsion angles and then adjusting the model with a protractor.

The plastic is white and can be painted to distinguish between O and N atoms. Hydrogen atoms are normally implicit and modelled by snipping off the spokes. A model of a typical protein with approximately 300 residues could take a month to build. It was common for laboratories to build a model for each protein solved. By 2005, so many protein structures were being determined that relatively few models were made.

== Computer-based models ==
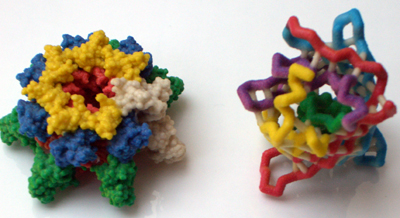
Integrated protein models

With the development of computer-based physical modelling, it is now possible to create complete single-piece models by feeding the coordinates of a surface into the computer. Figure 6 shows models of anthrax toxin, left (at a scale of approximately 20 Å/cm or 1:5,000,000) and green fluorescent protein, right (5 cm high, at a scale of about 4 Å/cm or 1:25,000,000) from 3D Molecular Design. Models are made of plaster or starch, using a rapid prototyping process.

It has also recently become possible to create accurate molecular models inside glass blocks using a technique known as subsurface laser engraving.

== Computational models ==
Computers can also model molecules mathematically. Programs such as Avogadro can run on typical desktops and can predict bond lengths and angles, molecular polarity and charge distribution, and even quantum mechanical properties such as absorption and emission spectra. However, these sorts of programs cannot model molecules as more atoms are added, because the number of calculations is quadratic in the number of atoms involved; if four times as many atoms are used in a molecule, the calculations with take 16 times as long. For most practical purposes, such as drug design or protein folding, the calculations of a model require supercomputing or cannot be done on classical computers at all in a reasonable amount of time. Quantum computers can model molecules with fewer calculations because the type of calculations performed in each cycle by a quantum computer are well-suited to molecular modelling.

== Origami ==
Origami, or paper folding, can be used to represent protein structures in globular or amyloid forms.

== Common colors ==
Some of the most common colors used in molecular models are as follows:

Hydrogen	white
Alkali metals	violet
Alkaline earth metals	dark green
Boron, most transition metals	Pink
Carbon	black
Nitrogen	blue
Oxygen	red
Fluorine	green yellow
Chlorine	lime green
Bromine	dark red
Iodine	dark violet
Noble gases	cyan
Phosphorus	orange
Sulfur	yellow
Titanium	gray
Copper	apricot
Mercury	light grey

== Chronology ==
This table is an incomplete chronology of events where physical molecular models provided major scientific insights.

Developer(s)	Date	Technology	Comments
Johannes Kepler	c. 1600		sphere packing, symmetry of snowflakes.
Johann Josef Loschmidt	1861	2-D graphics	representation of atoms and bonds by touching circles
August Wilhelm von Hofmann	1860	ball-and-stick	first recognisable physical molecular model
Jacobus Henricus van 't Hoff	1874	paper?	representation of atoms as tetrahedra supported the development of stereochemistry
John Desmond Bernal	c. 1930	Plasticine and spokes	model of liquid water
Robert Corey, Linus Pauling, Walter Koltun (CPK coloring)	1951	Space-filling models of alpha-helix, etc.	Pauling's "Nature of the Chemical Bond" covered all aspects of molecular structure and influenced many aspects of models
Francis Crick and James D. Watson	1953	spikes, flat templates and connectors with screws	model of DNA
Molecular graphics	c. 1960	display on computer screens	complements rather than replaces physical models
Zeinalipour-Yazdi, Peterson, Pullman, Catlow	c. 2005	sphere-in-contact models of graphite	physical molecular models that show correctly the electron density of carbon materials

== See also ==
- Molecular design software
- Molecular graphics
- Molecular modelling
- Ribbon diagram
- Software for molecular mechanics modeling
- Space-filling (Calotte) model
- Chemical formula
