= Corey–Pauling rules =

In biochemistry, the Corey–Pauling rules are a set of three basic statements that govern the secondary nature of proteins, in particular, the CO-NH peptide link. They were originally proposed by Robert Corey and Linus Pauling.

The rules are as follows:

1. The atoms in a peptide link all lie on the same plane.
2. The nitrogen, hydrogen, and oxygen atoms in a hydrogen bond are approximately in a straight line.
3. The carbon-oxygen and nitrogen-hydrogen groups are all involved in bonding.
