= Ball-and-stick model =

Representation of a molecule's bonds and 3D structure

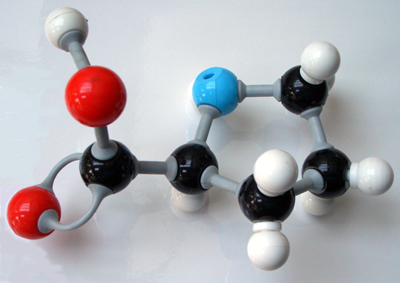
A plastic ball-and-stick model of proline

In chemistry, the ball-and-stick model is a molecular model of a chemical substance which displays both the three-dimensional position of the atoms and the bonds between them. The atoms are typically represented by spheres, connected by rods which represent the bonds. Double and triple bonds are usually represented by two or three curved rods, respectively, or alternately by correctly positioned sticks for the sigma and pi bonds. In a good model, the angles between the rods should be the same as the angles between the bonds, and the distances between the centers of the spheres should be proportional to the distances between the corresponding atomic nuclei. The chemical element of each atom is often indicated by the sphere's color.

In a ball-and-stick model, the radius of the spheres is usually much smaller than the rod lengths, in order to provide a clearer view of the atoms and bonds throughout the model. As a consequence, the model does not provide a clear insight about the space occupied by the model. In this aspect, ball-and-stick models are distinct from space-filling (calotte) models, where the sphere radii are proportional to the Van der Waals atomic radii in the same scale as the atom distances, and therefore show the occupied space but not the bonds.

The motion of water molecules at room temperature and their transient interactions with each other

Ball-and-stick models can be physical artifacts or computer model/molecular graphics. The former are usually built from molecular modeling kits, consisting of a number of coil springs or plastic or wood sticks, and a number of plastic balls with pre-drilled holes. The sphere colors commonly follow the CPK coloring. Some university courses on chemistry require students to buy such model kits.

== History ==
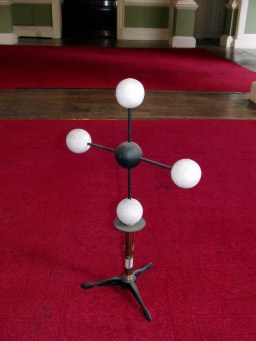
Hofmann's 1865 ball-and-stick model of methane (CH_{4}). Later discoveries disproved this geometry.

In 1865, German chemist August Wilhelm von Hofmann was the first to make ball-and-stick molecular models. He used such models at the Royal Institution of Great Britain.

Specialist companies manufacture kits and models to order. One of the earlier companies was Woosters at Bottisham, Cambridgeshire, UK. Besides tetrahedral, trigonal and octahedral holes, there were all-purpose balls with 24 holes. These models allowed rotation about the single rod bonds, which could be both an advantage (showing molecular flexibility) and a disadvantage (models are floppy). The approximate scale was 5 cm per ångström (0.5 m/nm or 500,000,000:1), but was not consistent over all elements.

The Beeverses Miniature Models company in Edinburgh (now operating as Miramodus) produced small models beginning in 1961 using colored PMMA balls and stainless steel rods. In these models, the use of individually drilled balls with precise bond angles and bond lengths enabled large crystal structures to be accurately created in a light and rigid form.

== See also ==
- structural formula – Graphic representation of a molecular structure
