= CPK coloring =

Colour convention for differentiating atoms

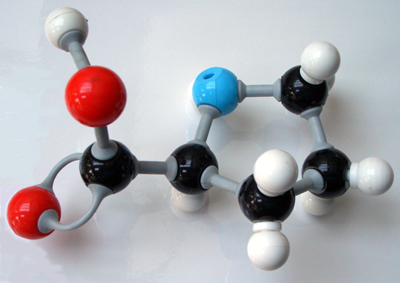
A plastic ball-and-stick model of proline. These models usually comply with CPK coloring.

In chemistry, the CPK coloring (for Corey–Pauling–Koltun) is a popular color convention for distinguishing atoms of different chemical elements in molecular models.

== History ==
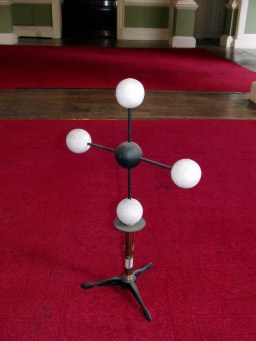
Hofmann's methane model

August Wilhelm von Hofmann was apparently the first to introduce molecular models into organic chemistry, following August Kekule's introduction of the theory of chemical structure in 1858, and Alexander Crum Brown's introduction of printed structural formulas in 1861. At a Friday Evening Discourse at London's Royal Institution on April 7, 1865, he displayed molecular models of simple organic substances such as methane, ethane, and methyl chloride, which he had had constructed from differently colored table croquet balls connected together with thin brass tubes. Hofmann's original colour scheme (carbon = black, hydrogen = white, nitrogen = blue, oxygen = red, chlorine = green, and sulphur = yellow) has evolved into the later color schemes.

In 1952, Corey and Pauling published a description of space-filling models of proteins and other biomolecules that they had been building at Caltech. Their models represented atoms by faceted hardwood balls, painted in different bright colors to indicate the respective chemical elements. Their color schema included

- White for hydrogen
- Black for carbon
- Sky blue for nitrogen
- Red for oxygen

They also built smaller models using plastic balls with the same color schema.

In 1965 Koltun patented an improved version of the Corey and Pauling modeling technique. In his patent he mentions the following colors:

- White for hydrogen
- Black for carbon
- Blue for nitrogen
- Red for oxygen
- Deep yellow for sulfur
- Purple for phosphorus
- Light, medium, medium dark, and dark green for the halogens (F, Cl, Br, I)
- Silver for metals (Co, Fe, Ni, Cu)

== Typical assignments ==
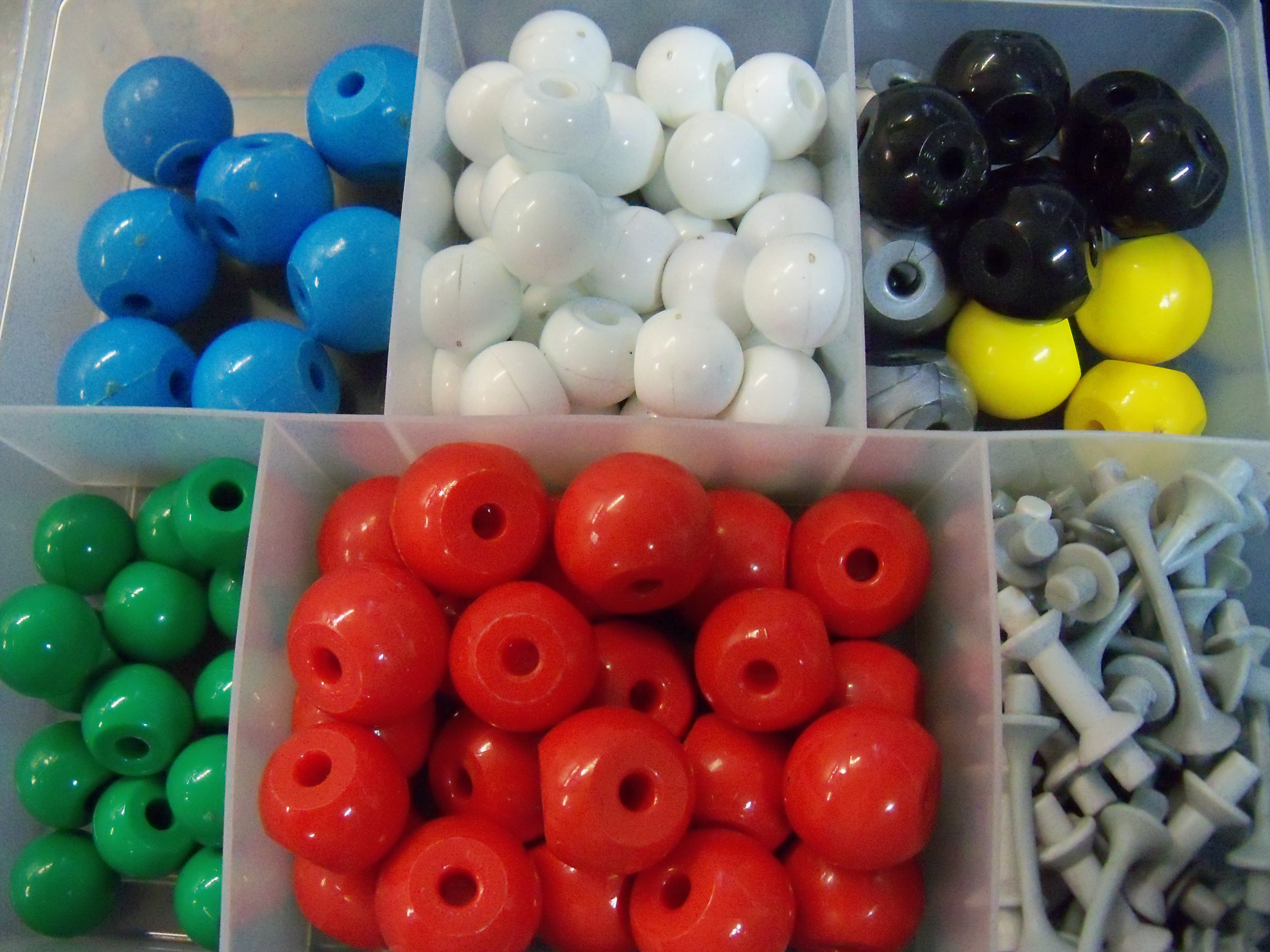
A box of ball-and-stick model pieces colored to represent several of the common elements.

Typical CPK color assignments include:

hydrogen (H)	white
carbon (C)	black
nitrogen (N)	blue
oxygen (O)	red
fluorine (F), chlorine (Cl)	green
bromine (Br)	dark red
iodine (I)	dark violet
noble gases (He, Ne, Ar, Kr, Xe, Rn)	cyan
phosphorus (P)	orange
sulfur (S)	yellow
boron (B), most transition metals	beige
alkali metals (Li, Na, K, Rb, Cs, Fr)	violet
alkaline earth metals (Be, Mg, Ca, Sr, Ba, Ra)	dark green
titanium (Ti)	grey
iron (Fe)	dark orange
other elements	pink

Several of the CPK colors refer mnemonically to colors of the pure elements or notable compound. For example, hydrogen is a colorless gas, carbon as charcoal, graphite or coke is black, sulfur powder is yellow, chlorine is a greenish gas, bromine is a dark red liquid, iodine in ether is violet, amorphous phosphorus is red, rust is dark orange-red, etc. For some colors, such as those of oxygen and nitrogen, the inspiration is less clear. Red for oxygen was inspired by the fact that this "fiery" element is required for combustion. Blue for nitrogen may have been inspired by the fact that nitrogen is the main component of Earth's atmosphere.

In von Hofmann's 1865 talk at the Royal Institution in London, he built models from croquet balls, which were available in multiple colours. At the time, croquet was the most popular sport in England, so the balls were plentiful.

== Modern variants ==
Example of Jmol coloring

The following table shows colors assigned to each element by some popular software products.

- Column C is the original assignment by Corey and Pauling.
- Column K is that of Koltun's patent.
- Column J is the color scheme used by the molecular visualizer Jmol.
- Column R is the scheme used by Rasmol; when two colors are shown, the second one is valid for versions 2.7.3 and later.
- Column P consists of the colors in the PubChem database managed by the United States National Institute of Health.

All colors are approximate and may depend on the display hardware and viewing conditions.

			Colors				
Z	Symbol	Element	C	K	J	R	P
			Corey	Koltun	Jmol	Rasmol	PubChem
1	H	hydrogen					
1	^{2}H (D)	deuterium					
1	^{3}H (T)	tritium					
2	He	helium					
3	Li	lithium					
4	Be	beryllium					
5	B	boron					
6	C	carbon					
6	^{13}C	carbon-13					
6	^{14}C	carbon-14					
7	N	nitrogen					
7	^{15}N	nitrogen-15					
8	O	oxygen					
9	F	fluorine					
10	Ne	neon					
11	Na	sodium					
12	Mg	magnesium					
13	Al	aluminium					
14	Si	silicon					
15	P	phosphorus					
16	S	sulfur					
17	Cl	chlorine					
18	Ar	argon					
19	K	potassium					
20	Ca	calcium					
21	Sc	scandium					
22	Ti	titanium					
23	V	vanadium					
24	Cr	chromium					
25	Mn	manganese					
26	Fe	iron					
27	Co	cobalt					
28	Ni	nickel					
29	Cu	copper					
30	Zn	zinc					
31	Ga	gallium					
32	Ge	germanium					
33	As	arsenic					
34	Se	selenium					
35	Br	bromine					
36	Kr	krypton					
37	Rb	rubidium					
38	Sr	strontium					
39	Y	yttrium					
40	Zr	zirconium					
41	Nb	niobium					
42	Mo	molybdenum					
43	Tc	technetium					
44	Ru	ruthenium					
45	Rh	rhodium					
46	Pd	palladium					
47	Ag	silver					
48	Cd	cadmium					
49	In	indium					
50	Sn	tin					
51	Sb	antimony					
52	Te	tellurium					
53	I	iodine					
54	Xe	xenon					
55	Cs	caesium					
56	Ba	barium					
57	La	lanthanum					
58	Ce	cerium					
59	Pr	praseodymium					
60	Nd	neodymium					
61	Pm	promethium					
62	Sm	samarium					
63	Eu	europium					
64	Gd	gadolinium					
65	Tb	terbium					
66	Dy	dysprosium					
67	Ho	holmium					
68	Er	erbium					
69	Tm	thulium					
70	Yb	ytterbium					
71	Lu	lutetium					
72	Hf	hafnium					
73	Ta	tantalum					
74	W	tungsten					
75	Re	rhenium					
76	Os	osmium					
77	Ir	iridium					
78	Pt	platinum					
79	Au	gold					
80	Hg	mercury					
81	Tl	thallium					
82	Pb	lead					
83	Bi	bismuth					
84	Po	polonium					
85	At	astatine					
86	Rn	radon					
87	Fr	francium					
88	Ra	radium					
89	Ac	actinium					
90	Th	thorium					
91	Pa	protactinium					
92	U	uranium					
93	Np	neptunium					
94	Pu	plutonium					
95	Am	americium					
96	Cm	curium					
97	Bk	berkelium					
98	Cf	californium					
99	Es	einsteinium					
100	Fm	fermium					
101	Md	mendelevium					
102	No	nobelium					
103	Lr	lawrencium					
104	Rf	rutherfordium					
105	Db	dubnium					
106	Sg	seaborgium					
107	Bh	bohrium					
108	Hs	hassium					
109	Mt	meitnerium					
110	Ds	darmstadtium					
111	Rg	roentgenium					
112	Cn	copernicium					
113	Nh	nihonium					
114	Fl	flerovium					
115	Mc	moscovium					
116	Lv	livermorium					
117	Ts	tennessine					
118	Og	oganesson					

== See also ==
- Ball-and-stick model
- Molecular graphics
- Software for molecular modeling
