= Robert B. Corey =

American biochemist (1897–1971)

- Born: August 19, 1897
- Died: April 23, 1971 (aged 73)
- Education: University of Pittsburgh, Cornell University (Ph.D.)
- Known for: First description of the α-helix and β-sheet
- Scientific career
- Institutions: Caltech
- Academic advisors: Linus Pauling

Robert B. Corey (August 19, 1897 – April 23, 1971) was an American biochemist, mostly known for his role in discovery of the α-helix and the β-sheet with Linus Pauling. Also working with Pauling was Herman Branson. Their discoveries were remarkably correct, with even the bond lengths being accurate until about 40 years later. The α-helix and β-sheet are two structures that are now known to form the backbones of many proteins.

== Academic training ==
A childhood polio survivor, Corey received his undergraduate degree from the University of Pittsburgh, and his Ph.D. in chemistry from Cornell University.

== The findings of α-helix and β-sheet ==
At Caltech, the trio (Pauling, Corey and Branson) published a series of articles in the Proceedings of the National Academy of Sciences.

The most revolutionary of the articles in PNAS is the one written on February 28, 1951. That date was also Pauling's 50th birthday. It was called "The Structure of Proteins: Two Hydrogen-Bonded Helical Configurations of the Polypeptide Chain". In the paper, one odd thing is that the trio diagrammed the α-helix as a left-handed helix, although it is really a right-handed one. Another odd thing in the paper is that the 3(10) helix is almost never mentioned, although it is very common, while the γ-helix, which was another focus of the paper, is almost never found in nature.

== See also ==
- CPK coloring
- Corey–Pauling rules
