= History of cocaine =

History of the stimulant drug

Coca leaves have been used by indigenous South Americans for thousands of years, both as a stimulant and for medicinal purposes. When the Spanish arrived in South America, they initially banned coca but soon legalized and taxed it after seeing its importance to local labor The active ingredient, cocaine, was first isolated in 1855 by Friedrich Gaedcke and later refined by Albert Niemann, who named it “cocaine.” In the late 1800s, cocaine became popular in Western medicine as a local anesthetic and was widely used in various products, including drinks and remedies. In 1885, James Leonard Corning demonstrated its use in peridural anesthesia. However, due to its toxic effects and potential for abuse, safer alternatives eventually replaced it in medical practice.

== Discovery ==
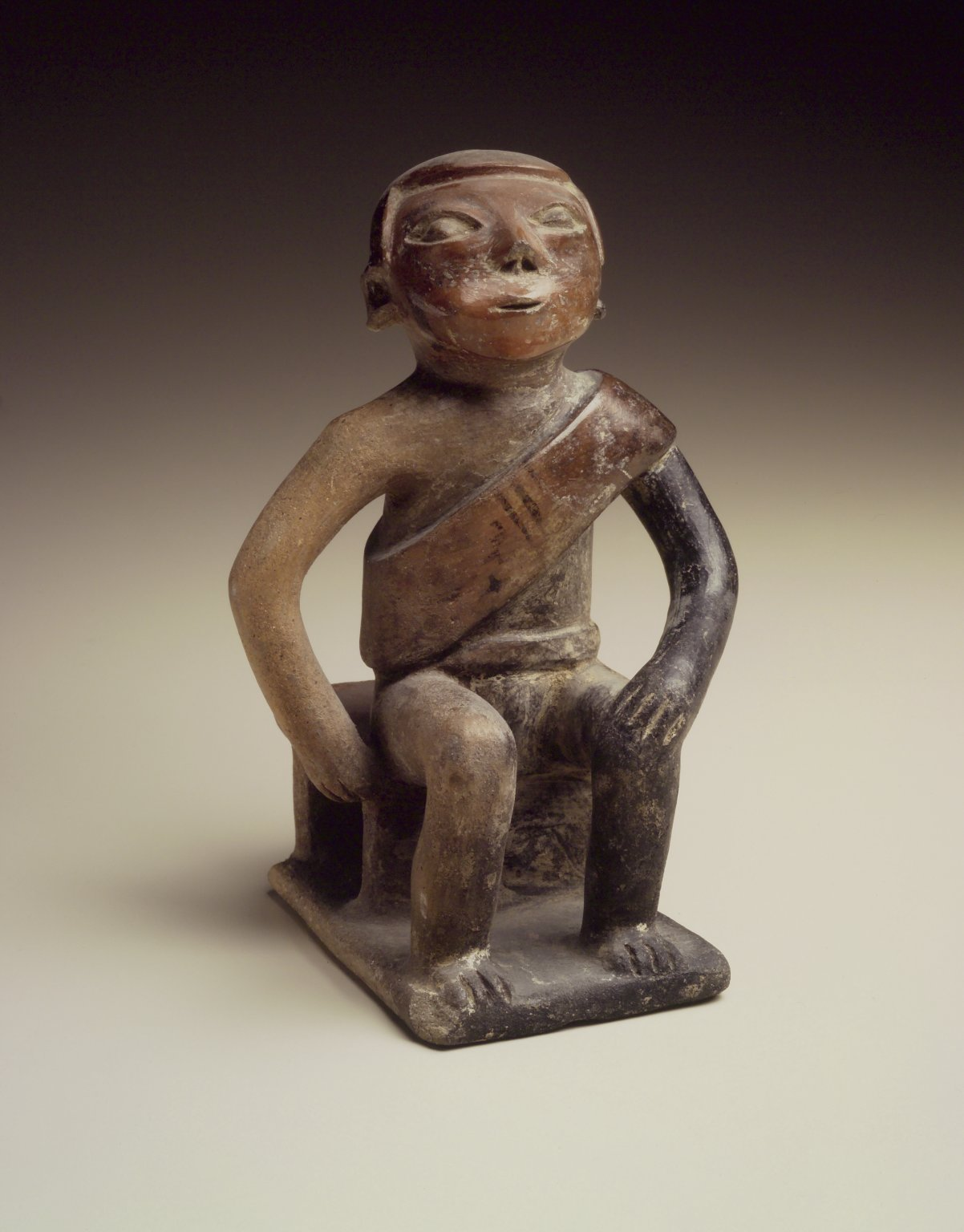
Coquero (Figure Chewing Coca), 850–1500 C.E. Brooklyn Museum

Indigenous peoples of South America have chewed the leaves of Erythroxylon coca—a plant that contains vital nutrients as well as numerous alkaloids, including cocaine—for over a thousand years. The oldest evidence for the chewing of coca leaves dates back to c. 8000 B.C.E in Peru. The coca leaf was, and still is, chewed almost universally by some indigenous communities. The remains of coca leaves have been found with ancient Peruvian mummies, and pottery from the time period depicts humans with bulged cheeks, indicating the presence of something on which they are chewing. There is also evidence that these cultures used a mixture of coca leaves and saliva as an anesthetic for the performance of trepanation.

When the Spanish arrived in South America, the conquistadors at first banned coca as an "evil agent of devil". But after discovering that without the coca the locals were barely able to work, the conquistadors legalized and taxed the leaf, taking 10% off the value of each crop. In 1569, Spanish botanist Nicolás Monardes described the indigenous peoples' practice of chewing a mixture of tobacco and coca leaves to induce "great contentment":

When they wished to make themselves drunk and out of judgment they chewed a mixture of tobacco and coca leaves which make them go as they were out of their wittes.

In 1609, Padre Blas Valera wrote:

Coca protects the body from many ailments, and our doctors use it in powdered form to reduce the swelling of wounds, to strengthen broken bones, to expel cold from the body or prevent it from entering, and to cure rotten wounds or sores that are full of maggots. And if it does so much for outward ailments, will not its singular virtue have even greater effect in the entrails of those who eat it?

== Isolation and naming ==
Although the stimulant and hunger-suppressant properties of coca leaves had been known for many centuries, the isolation of the cocaine alkaloid is thought to not having been achieved until 1855. Various European scientists had attempted to isolate cocaine, but none had been successful. Usually, two reasons are stated for this: the knowledge of chemistry required was insufficient, and conditions of sea-shipping from South America at the time would often degrade the quality of the cocaine in the plant samples available to European chemists by the time they arrived. However, by 1855, the German chemist Friedrich Gaedcke successfully isolated the cocaine alkaloid. Gaedcke named the alkaloid "erythroxyline", and published a description in the journal Archiv der Pharmazie. It is now thought that Gaedcke's try took place only in 1858 and it was contested by his contemporaries. Recently, historians have also brought attention to Bolivian claims of cocaine isolation in the Bolivian Yungas and a pharmacy in La Paz before Gaedcke's.

In 1856, Friedrich Wöhler asked Dr. Carl Scherzer, a scientist aboard the Novara (an Austrian frigate sent by Emperor Franz Joseph to circle the globe), to bring him a large amount of coca leaves from South America. In 1859, the ship finished its travels and Wöhler received a trunk full of coca. Wöhler passed on the leaves to Albert Niemann, a PhD student at the University of Göttingen in Germany, who then developed an improved purification process.

Niemann described every step he took to isolate cocaine in his dissertation titled Über eine neue organische Base in den Cocablättern (On a New Organic Base in the Coca Leaves), which was published in 1860 and earned him his Ph.D. He wrote of the alkaloid's "colourless transparent prisms" and said that "Its solutions have an alkaline reaction, a bitter taste, promote the flow of saliva and leave a peculiar numbness, followed by a sense of cold when applied to the tongue." Niemann named the alkaloid "cocaine" from "coca" (from Quechua "kúka") + suffix "ine".

The first synthesis and elucidation of the structure of the cocaine molecule was by Richard Willstätter in 1898. It was the first biomimetic synthesis of an organic structure recorded in academic chemical literature. The synthesis started from tropinone, a related natural product and took five steps.

Because of the former use of cocaine as a local anesthetic, a suffix "-caine" was later extracted and used to form names of synthetic local anesthetics.

== Medicalization ==
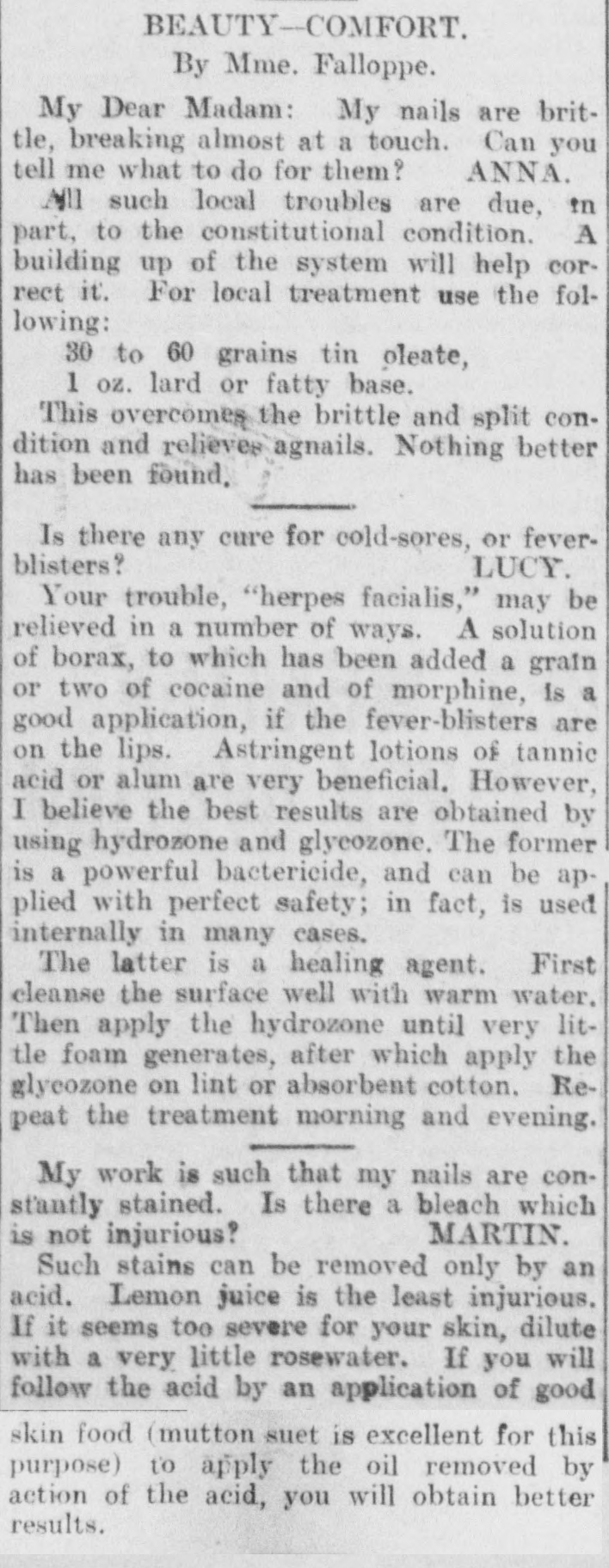
In this 1904 advice column from the Tacoma Times, "Madame Falloppe" recommended that cold sores be treated with a solution of borax, cocaine, and morphine.

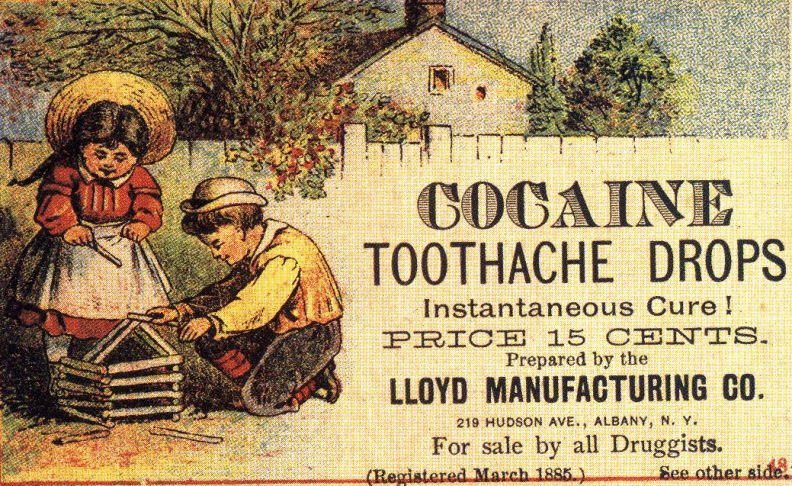
"Cocaine toothache drops", 1885 advertisement of cocaine for dental pain in children

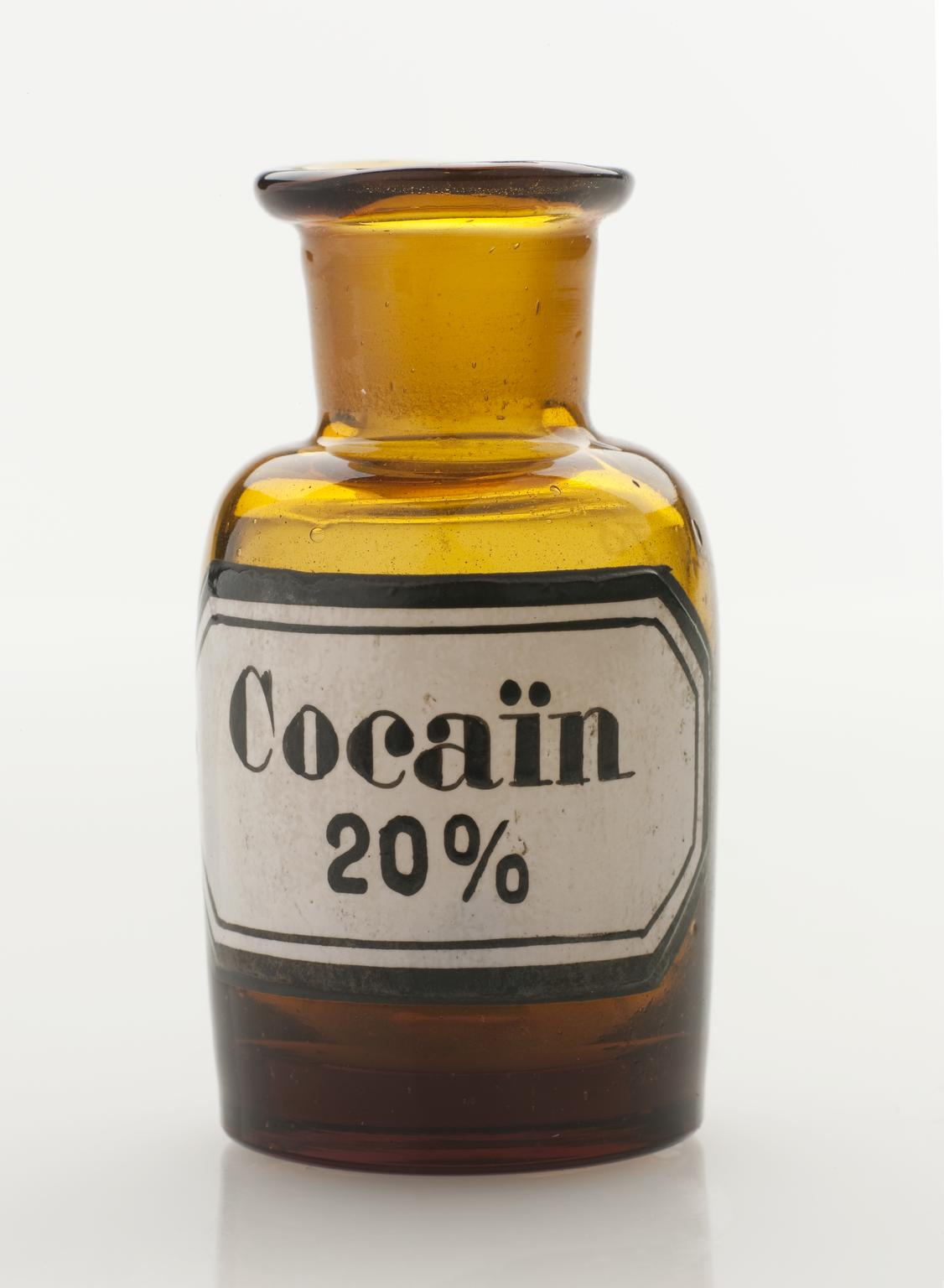
Bottle of cocaine solution, Germany, circa 1915.

With the discovery of this new alkaloid, Western medicine was quick to exploit the possible uses of this plant.

In 1879, Vassili von Anrep, of the University of Würzburg, devised an experiment to demonstrate the analgesic properties of the newly discovered alkaloid. He prepared two separate jars, one containing a cocaine-salt solution, with the other containing merely saltwater. He then submerged a frog's legs into the two jars, one leg in the treatment and one in the control solution, and proceeded to stimulate the legs in several different ways. The leg that had been immersed in the cocaine solution reacted very differently from the leg that had been immersed in saltwater.

Karl Koller (a close associate of Sigmund Freud, who would write about cocaine later) experimented with cocaine for ophthalmic usage. In an infamous experiment in 1884, he experimented upon himself by applying a cocaine solution to his own eye and then pricking it with pins. His findings were presented to the Heidelberg Ophthalmological Society. Also in 1884, Jellinek demonstrated the effects of cocaine as a respiratory system anesthetic. In 1885, William Halsted demonstrated nerve-block anesthesia, and James Leonard Corning demonstrated peridural anesthesia. 1898 saw Heinrich Quincke use cocaine for spinal anesthesia.

Although cocaine has traditionally been used for anesthesia in these procedures, substantial evidence shows it can cause severe and unpredictable toxic reactions, even with experienced practitioners. As a result, cocaine is no longer recommended for endonasal surgery. Safer and well-tolerated alternatives—such as lidocaine or tetracaine combined with agents like epinephrine, naphazoline, or oxymetazoline—are now preferred for topical and infiltration anesthesia.

== Popularization ==
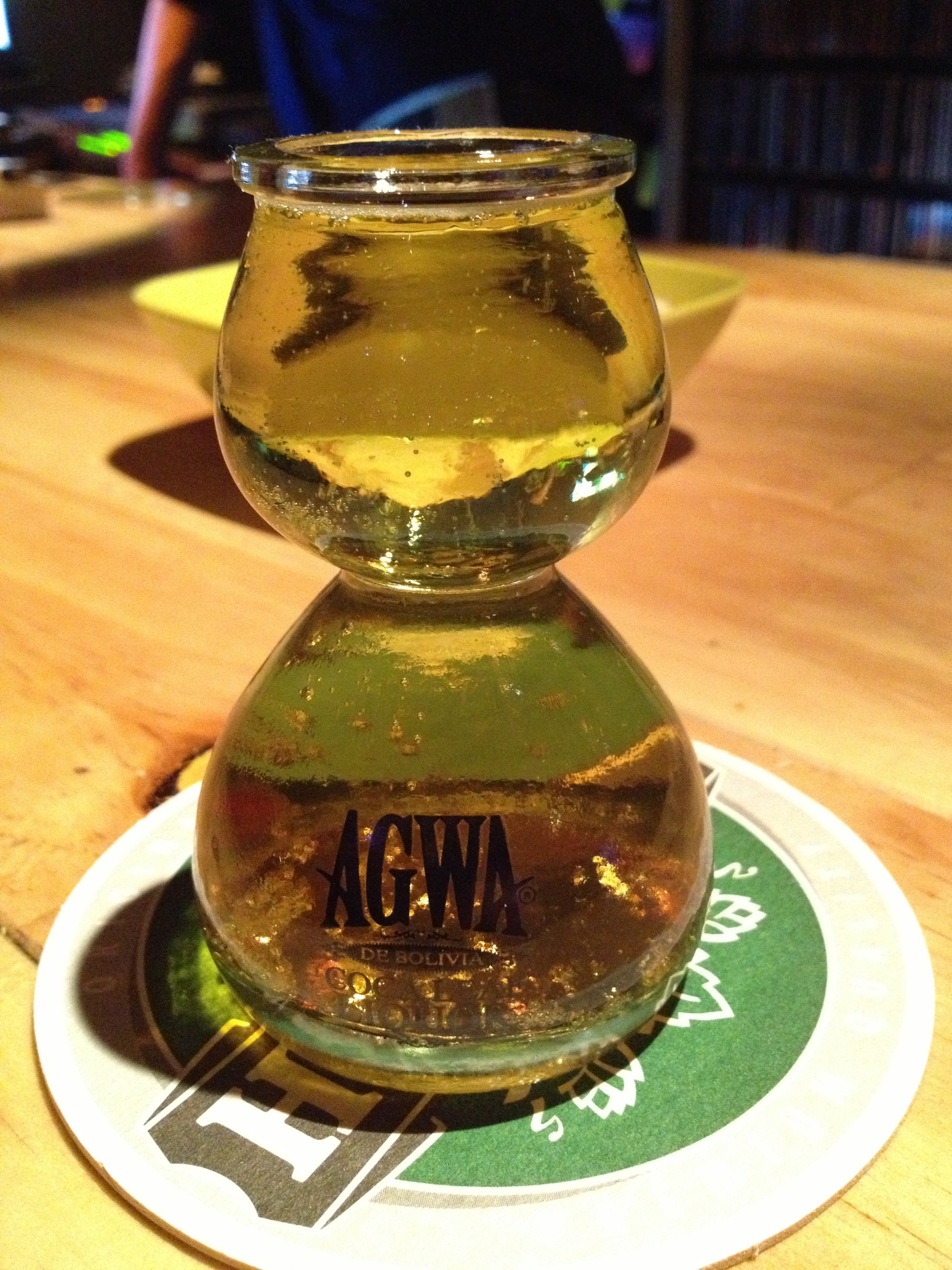
Agwa bomb at a bar in Itaewon, Seoul

In 1859, an Italian doctor, Paolo Mantegazza, returned from Peru, where he had witnessed first-hand the use of coca by the local indigenous peoples. He proceeded to experiment on himself and upon his return to Milan, he wrote a paper in which he described the effects. In this paper, he declared coca and cocaine (at the time they were assumed to be the same) as being useful medicinally, in the treatment of "a furred tongue in the morning, flatulence, and whitening of the teeth."

A chemist named Angelo Mariani who read Mantegazza's paper became immediately intrigued with coca and its economic potential.

Agwa de Bolivia, often shortened to AGWA, is a herbal liqueur made with Bolivian coca leaves and 37 other natural herbs and botanicals including green tea, ginseng, and guarana, Agwa de Bolivia Liqueur dates its establishment to 1863 in Amsterdam.

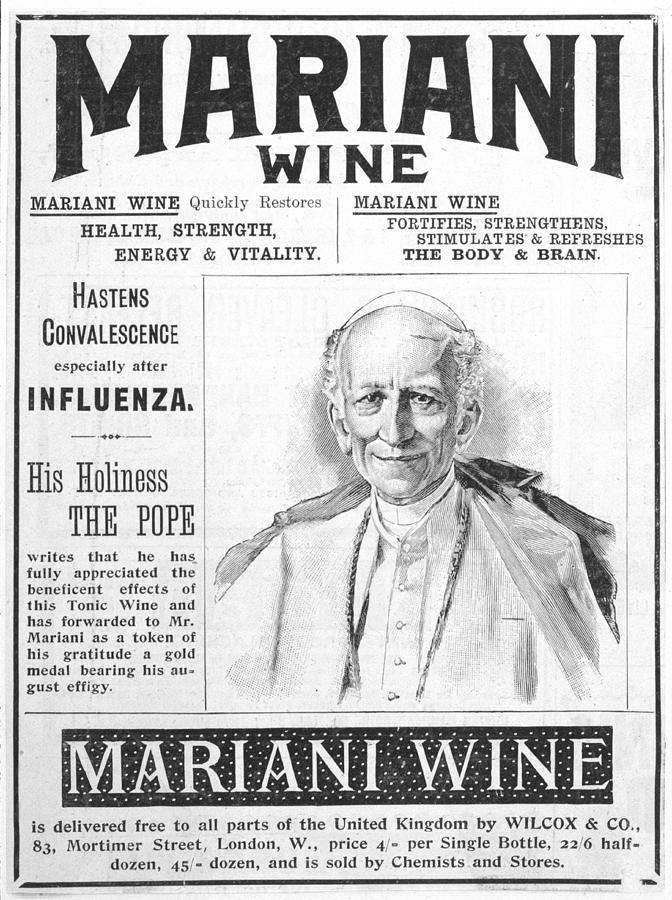
Pope Leo XIII purportedly carried a hip flask of the coca-treated Vin Mariani with him, and awarded a Vatican gold medal to Angelo Mariani.

In 1863, Mariani started marketing a wine called Vin Mariani, which had been treated with coca leaves, to become coca wine. The ethanol in wine acted as a solvent and extracted the cocaine from the coca leaves, altering the drink's effect. It contained 6 mg cocaine per ounce of wine, but Vin Mariani which was to be exported contained 7.2 mg per ounce, to compete with the higher cocaine content of similar drinks in the United States.

In 1879 cocaine began to be used to treat morphine addiction. Cocaine was introduced into clinical use as a local anesthetic in Germany in 1884, about the same time as Sigmund Freud published his work Über Coca, in which he wrote that cocaine causes:

Exhilaration and lasting euphoria, which in no way differs from the normal euphoria of the healthy person. You perceive an increase of self-control and possess more vitality and capacity for work. In other words, you are simply normal, and it is soon hard to believe you are under the influence of any drug. Long intensive physical work is performed without any fatigue. This result is enjoyed without any of the unpleasant after-effects that follow exhilaration brought about by alcoholic beverages. No craving for the further use of cocaine appears after the first, or even after repeated taking of the drug.

By 1885 the U.S. manufacturer Parke-Davis sold coca-leaf cigarettes and cheroots, a cocaine inhalant, a Coca Cordial, cocaine crystals, and cocaine solution for intravenous injection. The company promised that its cocaine products would "supply the place of food, make the coward brave, the silent eloquent and render the sufferer insensitive to pain."

Tri-state Drug sign, Route 80, Shreveport, Louisiana

A "pinch of coca leaves" was included in John Styth Pemberton's original 1886 recipe for Coca-Cola, though the company began using decocainized leaves in 1906 when the Pure Food and Drug Act was passed. Today, Coca-Cola continues to use decocainized coca leaf extract for flavoring, which is processed by the Stepan Company in New Jersey; the leftover cocaine byproduct is sold for medical use.

By the late Victorian era, cocaine use had appeared as a vice in literature. For example, it was injected by Arthur Conan Doyle's fictional Sherlock Holmes, generally to offset the boredom he felt when he was not working on a case.

In early 20th-century Memphis, Tennessee, cocaine was sold in neighborhood drugstores on Beale Street, costing five or ten cents for a small boxful. Dockworkers along the Mississippi River used the drug as a stimulant, and white employers encouraged its use by black laborers.

In 1909, Ernest Shackleton took "Forced March" brand cocaine tablets to Antarctica, as did Captain Scott a year later on his ill-fated journey to the South Pole.

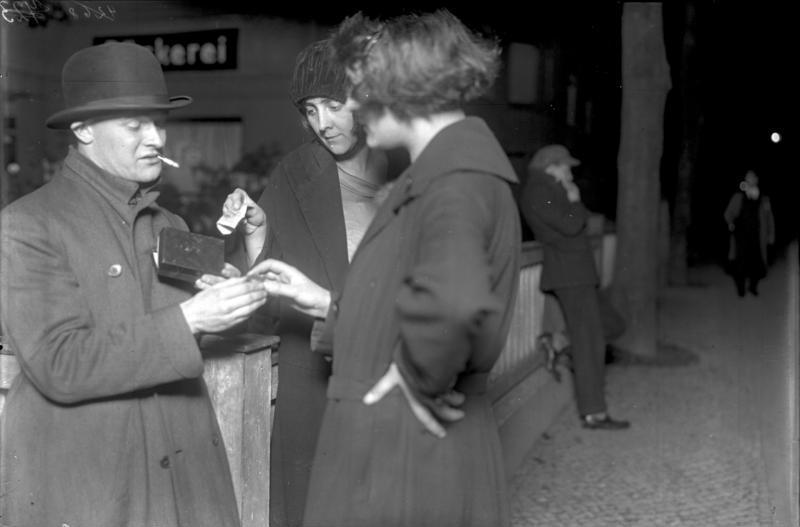
Women purchase cocaine capsules in Berlin, 1929

In the 1931 song "Minnie the Moocher", Cab Calloway heavily references cocaine use. He uses the phrase "kicking the gong around", slang for cocaine use; describes titular character Minnie as "tall and skinny;" and describes Smokey Joe as "cokey". In the 1932 comedy musical film The Big Broadcast, Cab Calloway performs the song with his orchestra and mimes snorting cocaine in between verses.

During the mid-1940s, amidst World War II, cocaine was considered for inclusion as an ingredient of a future generation of 'pep pills' for the German military, code named D-IX.

A cocaine trade was emerging in the Americas following World War II.

In 2006, Hype Beverages produced Cocaine Energy Supplement, also known as "Cocaine Energy Drink", a highly caffeinated energy drink.

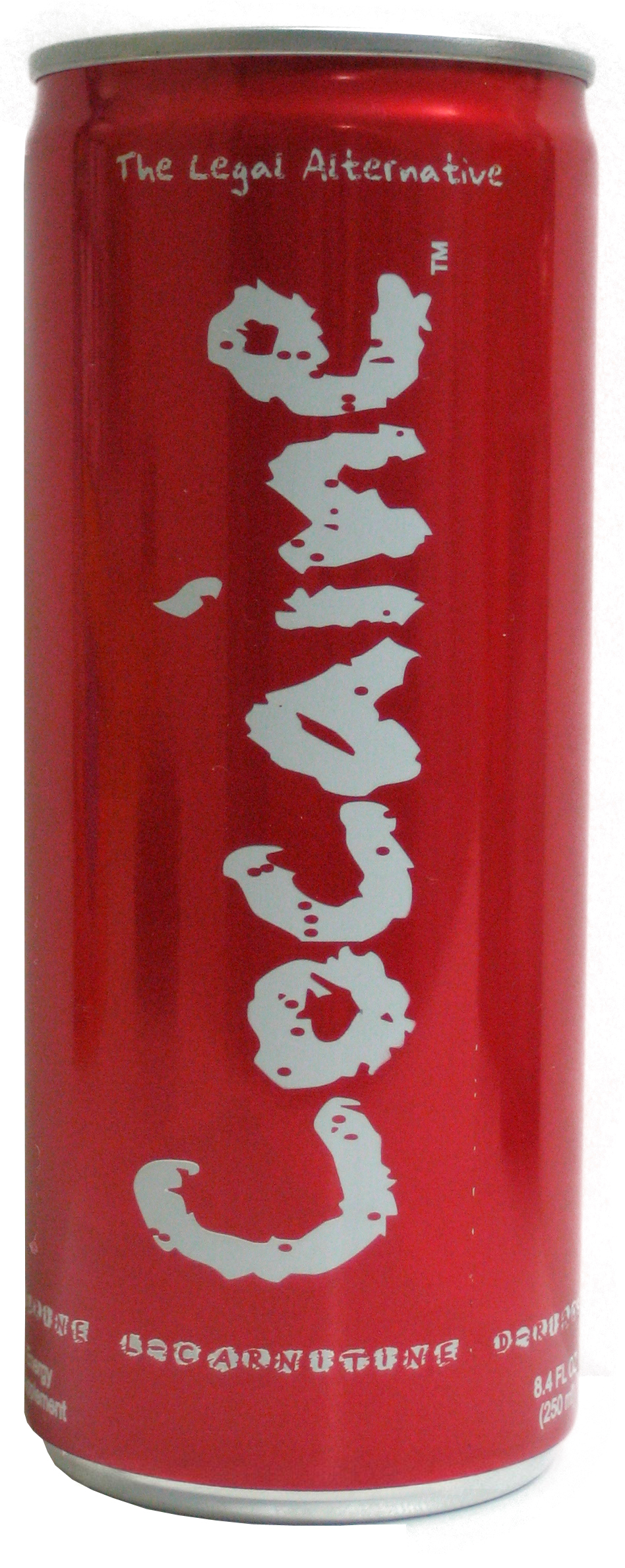
Cocaine Energy Drink

Although the beverage contained no actual cocaine, the product launch attracted criticism from lawmakers and anti-drug organizations, who felt that Cocaine glamorized drug usage to children.

Coca Colla is an energy drink produced in Bolivia with the use of coca extract as its base. It was launched on the Bolivian market in La Paz, Santa Cruz and Cochabamba in April 2010.

In modern popular culture, references to cocaine are common. The drug has a glamorous image associated with the upper class, famous and powerful, and is said to make users "feel rich and beautiful".

== Modern usage ==
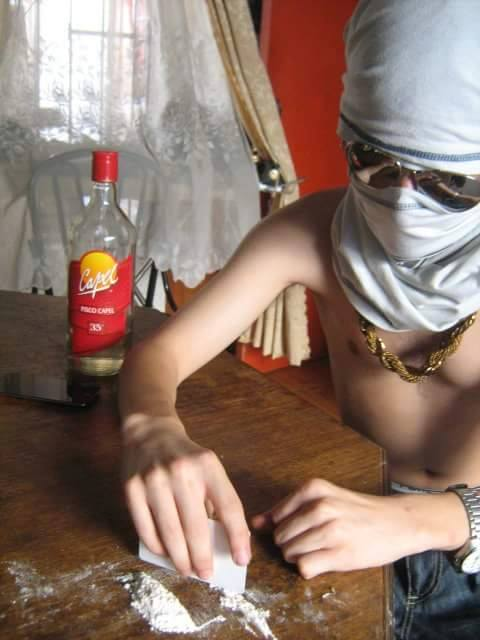
Student dividing cocaine

In many countries, cocaine is a popular recreational drug. Cocaine use is prevalent across all socioeconomic strata, including age, demographics, economic, social, political, religious, and livelihood.

Since the 1980s, the cocaine trade was dominated by centralized, hierarchical drug cartels such as Medellín and Cali, along with their successors and early FARC factions. By the early 2000s, this model fragmented into a diverse network of global trafficking links, allowing South American cocaine production to easily supply markets in Europe, Africa, Asia, and Oceania through various routes.

In the United States, the development of "crack" cocaine introduced the substance to a generally poorer inner-city market. The use of the powder form has stayed relatively constant, experiencing a new height of use across the 1980s and 1990s in the U.S. However, from 2006 to 2010 cocaine use in the US declined by roughly half before again rising once again from 2017 onwards. In the UK, cocaine use increased significantly between the 1990s and late 2000s, with a similar high consumption in some other European countries, including Spain.

The estimated U.S. cocaine market exceeded US$70 billion in street value for the year 2005, exceeding revenues by corporations such as Starbucks. Cocaine's status as a club drug shows its immense popularity among the "party crowd".

In 1995 the World Health Organization (WHO) and the United Nations Interregional Crime and Justice Research Institute (UNICRI) announced in a press release the publication of the results of the largest global study on cocaine use ever undertaken. An American representative in the World Health Assembly banned the publication of the study, because it seemed to make a case for the positive uses of cocaine. An excerpt of the report strongly conflicted with accepted paradigms, for example, "that occasional cocaine use does not typically lead to severe or even minor physical or social problems." In the sixth meeting of the B committee, the US representative threatened that "If World Health Organization activities relating to drugs failed to reinforce proven drug control approaches, funds for the relevant programs should be curtailed". This led to the decision to discontinue publication. A part of the study was recuperated and published in 2010, including profiles of cocaine use in 20 countries, but are unavailable as of 2015.

In October 2010 it was reported that the use of cocaine in Australia has doubled since monitoring began in 2003.

== See also ==
- Coca Museum
