= AGWA =

AGWA or Agwa may refer to:

- Agwa de Bolivia, a herbal liqueur made with Bolivian coca leaves and 37 other natural herbs and botanicals
- Art Gallery of Western Australia, Perth, Australia
- Australian Government Web Archive, consisting of the bulk archiving of Commonwealth Government websites
