= Moritz Wagner (naturalist) =

German naturalist (1813–1887)

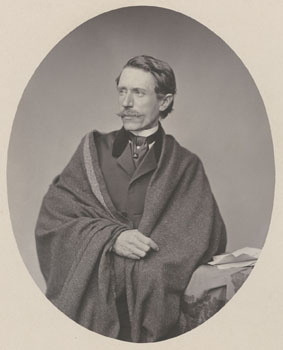
Moritz Wagner

Moritz Wagner (Bayreuth, 3 October 1813 – Munich, 31 May 1887) was a German explorer, collector, geographer and natural historian. A contemporary of Charles Darwin, he already accepted that species are not constant in time, but his formative biological work preceded Darwin's 1859 On the Origin of Species. At the end of his university studies, Wagner devoted three years (1836–1839) to the exploration of Algiers: and graduated with a doctorate in philosophy. While his travelogues were popular, he had found his scientific training insufficient, and in the early 1840s studied for another doctorate, in geology.

In May 1843, Wagner toured the Lake Sevan region of Armenia with Armenian writer Khachatur Abovian. From 1852 to 1855, together with Carl Scherzer, Wagner travelled through North and Central America and the Caribbean. During his travels, he made important observations in natural history, which he later supplemented and developed: that geographical isolation could play a key role in speciation. However, his insistence that what later came to be called peripatric and allopatric speciation, not natural selection, was the main driving force in the evolution of species, led to his ideas on geographic isolation being disregarded, unti lrevalidated in the evolutionary synthesis of the mid-20th century. A marginal figure by the 1880s, Wagner committed suicide in Munich, aged 73. His brother Rudolf was a physiologist and anatomist.

== Wagner's significance in evolutionary biology ==
Wagner's early career was as a geographer, and he published a number of geographical books about North Africa, the Middle East, and Tropical America. He was also a keen naturalist and collector, and it is for this work he is best known among biologists. Ernst Mayr, the evolutionist and historian of biology, has given an account of Wagner's significance.^{p562–565}. However, others disagree with this account. During his three years in Algeria, he (amongst other activities) studied the flightless beetles Pimelia and Melasoma. In these genera, a number of species are each confined to a stretch of the north coast between rivers which descend from the Atlas Mountains to the Mediterranean. As soon as one crosses a river, a different but closely related species appears.

Wagner made similar observations in the Caucasus and in the Andean valleys, leading him to conclude, after the Origin of Species had been published:

"... an incipient species will only [arise] when a few individuals transgress the limiting borders of their range... the formation of a new race will never succeed... without a long continued separation of the colonists from the other members of their species."

This was an early description of the process of geographic speciation by means of the founder effect. Another formulation of this idea came later: "Organisms which never leave their ancient area of distribution will never change".

Wagner's idea met with a mixed reception. "Unfortunately, Wagner combined [his idea] with some peculiar ideas on variation and selection" (Mayr). The leading evolutionists (Darwin, Wallace, Weismann) attacked Wagner's idea of geographic speciation, and it suffered a long decline until in 1942 it was reintroduced by Mayr. The importance of geographic speciation became one of the core ideas of the evolutionary synthesis.

== Criticism ==
Some modern experts such as Ernst Mayr, Jerry Coyne and H. Allen Orr, argue that Wagner pioneered the idea of geographical speciation, and that Darwin had not appreciated it. However, Wagner's "migration theory" was based on a rather simple, Lamarckian idea of evolution. Wagner argued in letters to Darwin that the latter had missed a vital geographic component in understanding the evolution of new species. Darwin at first responded in a friendly way to these letters, and agreed that geographic isolation was important (although not the only cause of speciation), and pointed out that he had in fact dealt with geographic speciation in The Origin of Species. Wagner in his later articles totally rejected the importance of natural selection. He again pointed out the importance of intercrossing in preventing divergence, and thus for geographic separation in allowing divergence. Wagner argued that Darwin had not understood this, although these ideas are present in The Origin of Species. Darwin found Wagner's increasingly hysterical tone and one-sided argument upsetting, and wrote across his copy of Wagner's 1875 paper "most wretched rubbish."

As well as Darwin, the Reverend J.T. Gulick also found Wagner's theories overstated. Gulick was apparently responding to David Starr Jordan, who approved of Wagner's geographic speciation ideas in a paper which is often cited as providing early support of geographical speciation. Jordan later wrote a brief note of correction agreeing with some of Gulick's criticisms:

"Mr. Gulick corrects certain erroneous assumptions on the part of Dr. Moritz Wagner. Mr. Gulick says:

1. Separate generation is a necessary condition for divergent evolution but not for the transformation of all the survivors of a species in one way.
2. Separation does not necessarily imply any external barriers or even the occupation of separate districts.
3. Diversity of natural selection is not necessary to diversity of evolution.
4. Difference of external conditions is not necessary to diversity of evolution. Separation and variation—that is, variation not overwhelmed by crossing—is all that is necessary to secure divergence of type in the descendants of one stock, though external conditions remain the same and though the separation is other than geological. ...

All of this is in general accord with my own experience."

In a later paper Gulick says that "Moritz Wagner, in his 'Law of the Migration of Organisms,' was the first to insist on the importance of geographical isolation as a factor in evolution, but when he asserted that without geographical isolation natural selection could have no effect in producing new species he went beyond what could be sustained by facts".

Mayr's formulation has been argued to have cleared up issues which Wagner had left unresolved: "A new species develops if a population which has become isolated from its parental species acquires during this period of isolation characters which promote or guarantee isolation when the external barriers break down". The zoological taxonomist Bernhard Rensch was also significant in keeping geographical speciation on the evolutionary menu. He identified geographical separation as the most frequent initial step towards cladogenesis (phylogenetic branching). However, a variety of species concepts compete with Mayr's isolation concept of species today, and so Mayr's account can no longer be accepted to be the gold standard (disambiguation).

The importance of Wagner's insight is highly debatable today, as it is clear that geographical isolation is not the only mechanism which causes species-splitting. Furthermore, it is generally accepted that natural selection is the most important cause of speciation, even when the geographical milieu is in isolation. There is room for debate as to whether Charles Darwin had reached a similar conclusion at the same time. The Origin of Species was published nearly twenty years after Wagner's first account, but more relevant is the evidence of his notebooks. The evidence of Darwin's notebooks (which were not published until the mid-20th century) shows a "clear description of reproductive isolation, maintained by ethological [behavioural] isolating mechanisms"^{p266}; the same ideas are also present in The Origin of Species, but are often not recognized as such by modern biologists. On the other hand, there is no single example in the notebooks quite so clear as Wagner's flightless beetles. Much of the good in Wagner's ideas is masked by his other, mistaken, beliefs, but his inferences about geographical speciation were important insights gained by observation of insects in their natural habitats.

"It took more than 60 years after 1859 until the leading specialists... [agreed] that this geographical approach was the way to solve the problem of speciation... a new species may evolve when a population acquires isolating mechanisms while isolated from its parent population.".

But again, see Sulloway's article. Speciation isn't just about geography, it is more important that it requires splitting that endures in spite of geographic overlap.

== Legacy ==
Moritz Wagner is commemorated in the scientific name of a species of venomous snake, Montivipera wagneri.

== Publications ==
- Reisen in der Regentschaft Algier in den Jahren 1836, 1837 und 1838. 3 Bde. Leipzig 1841.
- Der Kaukasus und das Land der Kosaken. 2 Bde. Leipzig 1847.
- Reise nach Kolchis. Leipzig 1850.
- Reise nach dem Ararat und dem Hochlande Armeniens. Stuttgart 1848.
- Reise nach Persien und dem Lande der Kurden. 2 Bde. Leipzig 1851.
- Die Republik Costa-Rica. Leipzig 1856.
- Über die hydrogaphischen Verhältnisse und das Vorkommen der Süßwasserfische in den Staaten Panama und Ecuador. Abhandlungen der königlich bayerischen Akademie der Wissenschaften, II Classe 11 (I Abt.)
- Reisen in Nordamerika in den Jahren 1852 und 1853. (with Carl Scherzer) 3 vols, Gotha 1861.
- Die Darwinsche Theorie und das Migrationsgesetz der Organismen. Leipzig 1868. English edition: Wagner M. 1873. The Darwinian theory and the law of the migration of organisms. Translated by J.L. Laird, London. Google Books:
- Naturwissenschaftliche Reisen im tropischen Amerika. Stuttgart 1870.
- Über den Einfluß der geographischen Isolierung und Kolonienbildung auf die morphologischen Veränderungen der Organismen. München 1871.
- Die Entstehung der Arten durch räumliche Sonderung. [The origin of species by spatial separation] Gesammelte Aufsätze. Benno Schwalbe, Basel 1889.
