= Adolph L. Reed Jr. =

American political scientist

Adolph Reed
- Born: Adolph Leonard Reed Jr. January 14, 1947 (age 79); New York City, U.S.

Academic background
- Education: University of North Carolina, Chapel Hill (BA); Atlanta University (PhD)
- Thesis: W.E.B Dubois, Liberal Collectivism and the Effort to Consolidate a Black Elite (1981)
- Doctoral advisor: Alex Willingham

Academic work
- Discipline: Political science
- Sub-discipline: American studies
- Institutions: Yale University; Northwestern University; The New School; University of Pennsylvania

Adolph Leonard Reed Jr. (born January 14, 1947) is an American professor emeritus of political science at the University of Pennsylvania, specializing in studies of issues of racism and U.S. politics.

He has taught at Yale, Northwestern, and the New School for Social Research and he has written on racial and economic inequality. He is a contributing editor to The New Republic and has been a frequent contributor to The Progressive, The Nation, and other left-wing publications. He is a founding member of the U.S. Labor Party.

== Biography ==
Born in The Bronx, New York, Reed was raised in New Orleans, Louisiana. In the late 1960s, he organized protests involving poor black people and antiwar soldiers.

He received his BA degree from the University of North Carolina at Chapel Hill in 1971 and his PhD from Atlanta University in 1981. During his doctoral studies, he worked as an advisor to Maynard Jackson, Atlanta's first black mayor.

== Views ==
Reed's work on U.S. politics is notable for its critique of identity politics and anti-racism, particularly of their role in black politics. Reed has been a vocal critic of the policies and ideology of black Democratic politicians. For instance, he often criticized the politics of Barack Obama, both before and during his presidency.

In an article in The Village Voice published on January 16, 1996, Reed said of Obama:

In Chicago, for instance, we've gotten a foretaste of the new breed of foundation-hatched black communitarian voices; one of them, a smooth Harvard lawyer with impeccable do-good credentials and vacuous-to-repressive neoliberal politics, has won a state senate seat on a base mainly in the liberal foundation and development worlds. His fundamentally bootstrap line was softened by a patina of the rhetoric of authentic community, talk about meeting in kitchens, small-scale solutions to social problems, and the predictable elevation of process over program — the point where identity politics converges with old-fashioned middle-class reform in favoring form over substance. I suspect that his ilk is the wave of the future in U.S. black politics, as in Haiti and wherever else the International Monetary Fund has sway. So far the black activist response hasn't been up to the challenge. We have to do better.

After South Carolina Governor Nikki Haley announced on December 17, 2012, that African-American Republican Tim Scott would be named to the soon-to-be-open U.S. Senate seat in South Carolina, held by Jim DeMint, Reed stated in an op-ed article published in The New York Times on December 18, 2012: "It obscures the fact that modern black Republicans have been more tokens than signs of progress."

Reed supported Bernie Sanders in the 2016 and 2020 presidential campaigns.

In May 2020, Reed was scheduled to speak at the DSA New York City chapter but the event was cancelled as a result of member opposition due to Reed's criticism of the political left's focus on the impact of the coronavirus on black people. The cancellation of Reed's event received criticism.

== Publications ==
=== Selected articles ===
- "The Myth of Class Reductionism". The New Republic (September 25, 2019)
- "Antiracism: a neoliberal alternative to a left". Dialectical Anthropology 42.2 (June 2018)
- "The Kerner Commission and the Irony of Antiracist Politics". Labor: Studies in Working-Class History of the Americas 14.4 (December 2017)
- "The Post-1965 Trajectory of Race, Class, and Urban Politics in the United States Reconsidered". Labor Studies Journal 41.3 (2016)
- "The Black-Labor-Left Alliance in the Neoliberal Age". New Labor Forum 25.2 (2016)
- "No Easy Solutions". Jacobin (2016)
- "Doubling Down in Atlantic City". Jacobin (2016)
- "Bernie Sanders and the New Class Politics". Jacobin (2016)
- "From Jenner to Dolezal: One Trans Good, the Other Not So Much". Common Dreams (Monday, June 15, 2015)
- "The James Brown Theory of Black Liberation." Jacobin. (2015)
- "The Strange Career of the Voting Rights Act: Selma in Fact and Fiction". New Labor Forum 24.2 (2015)
- "The Crisis of Labour and the Left in the United States'". (w/Mark Dudzic). Socialist Register. 51 (2014).
- "Michelle Goldberg Goes to Washington". Jacobin (2014)
- "Nothing Left: The Long, Slow Surrender of American Liberals". Harpers (March 2014)
- "Adolph Reed, Jr. Responds". New Labor Forum 23.1 (2013)
- "Marx, Race, and Neoliberalism". New Labor Forum 22.1 (2013)
- "Race, Class, Crisis: The Discourse of Racial Disparity and its Analytical Discontents" (w/Merlin Chowkwanyun) Socialist Register 48 (2012)
- "Why Labor's Soldiering for the Democrats is a Losing Battle". New Labor Forum 19.3 (Fall 2010)
- "The 2004 Election in Perspective: The Myth of 'Cultural Divide' and the Triumph of Neoliberal Ideology". American Quarterly 57.1 (2005)
- "Reinventing the Working Class: A Study in Elite Image Manipulation". New Labor Forum 13.3 (Fall 2004)
- "Race and the Disruption of the New Deal Coalition". Urban Affairs Quarterly 27.2 (1991)
- "W.E.B. Dubois: A Perspective on the Bases of his Political Thought". Political Theory 13.3 (1985)
- "Pan-Africanism: Ideology for Liberation?". The Black Scholar 3 (September 1971)

=== Books and chapters ===
- Black Studies, Cultural Politics, and the Evasion of Inequality: The Farce this Time (w/Kenneth W. Warren). Routledge (2025), ISBN 9781003569947
- No Politics but Class Politics (w/Walter Benn Michaels). Eris (2023), ISBN 978-1-912475-57-5
- The South: Jim Crow and Its Afterlives. Verso Books (2022), ISBN 978-1839766268
- "Foreword" in Crashing the Party: From the Bernie Sanders Campaign to a Progressive Movement (author), Heather Gautney. Verso Books (2018), ISBN 978-1786634320
- Renewing Black Intellectual History: The Ideological and Material Foundations of African American Thought (editor w/ Kenneth W. Warren). Routledge (2010), ISBN 978-1594516658
- "The study of black politics and the practice of black politics: their historical relation and evolution" in Problems and Methods in the Study of Politics, edited by Ian Shapiro, Rogers M. Smith, and Tarek E. Masoud. Cambridge University Press (2009), ISBN 978-0521539432
- "Class Inequality, Liberal Bad Faith, and Neoliberalism: The True Disaster of Katrina" in Capitalizing on Catastrophe: Neoliberal Strategies in Disaster Reconstruction, edited by Nandini Gunewardena and Mark Schuller. AltaMira Press (2008), ISBN 978-0759111035
- "Introduction", "Class-ifying the Hurricane" in Unnatural Disaster: The Nation on Hurricane Katrina. Editor Betsy Reed. Nation Books (2006), ISBN 978-1560259374
- "Why Is There No Black Political Movement?" in Cultural Resistance Reader by Stephen Duncombe. Verso (2002), ISBN 978-1859843796
- Without Justice for All: The New Liberalism and Our Retreat from Racial Equality. Routledge (2001), ISBN 978-0-8133-2051-9
- Class Notes: Posing as Politics and Other Thoughts on the American Scene. The New Press (2000), ISBN 978-1-56584-675-3
- Stirrings in the Jug: Black Politics in the Post-Segregation Era. University of Minnesota Press (1999), ISBN 978-0-8166-2681-6
- W.E.B. Du Bois and American Political Thought: Fabianism and the Color Line (1997), ISBN 978-0-19-513098-0
- "Demobilization in the New Black Political Regime: Ideological Capitulation and Radical Failure in the Postsegregation Era" in The Bubbling Cauldron: Race, Ethnicity, and the Urban Crisis, edited by Michael Smith and Joe Feagin. University of Minnesota Press (1995), ISBN 978-0816623327
- "The Allure of Malcolm X and the Changing Character of Black Politics" in Malcolm X: In Our Own Image, edited by Joe Wood. St. Martin's Press (1992), ISBN 0-312-06609-0. Reprinted in Stirrings in the Jug: Black Politics in the Post-Segregation Era.
- The Jesse Jackson Phenomenon: The Crisis of Purpose in Afro-American Politics (1986), ISBN 978-0-300-03543-8
- "Pan-Africanism as Black Liberalism: Du Bois and Garvey" in Pan-Africanism: New Directions in Strategy, edited by Ofuatey-Kodjoe. University Press of America (1986)
- Race, Politics, and Culture: Critical Essays on the Radicalism of the 1960s (editor) (1986), ISBN 978-0-313-24480-3
- "Black Particularity Reconsidered". Telos 39 (Spring 1979). New York: Telos Press. Reprinted in Is It Nation Time?: Contemporary Essays on Black Power and Black Nationalism. edited by Eddie S. Glaude Jr. University of Chicago Press (2002), ISBN 978-0226298221
