= Gold standard (disambiguation) =

A gold standard is a monetary standard under which the basic unit of currency is equal in value to and exchangeable for a specified amount of gold.

Gold standard may also refer to:

- Gold Standard Act, law enacted by United States Congress to back the United States dollar with physical gold
- Gold Standard issue, series of postage stamps issued by the Soviet Union between 1923 and 1927
- Gold standard (test), the diagnostic test, in the medical field, that is the best available under reasonable conditions
- Gold Standard (carbon offset standard), widely accepted standard for evaluating the value of carbon offsets
- Gold Standard Laboratories, record label
- "Gold Standard", nickname of professional wrestler Shelton Benjamin
- The Gold Standard, the title of an episode of the television show NCIS: Los Angeles
- Gold Standard Corpora (GSC), text corpora used for Natural language processing that have been annotated manually
- The Gold Standard and the Logic of Naturalism, book written by Walter Benn Michaels (1988)
