= Walter Benn Michaels =

American literary theorist and author (born 1948)

Walter Benn Michaels (born 1948) is an American literary theorist and author whose areas of research include American literature (particularly 19th-century to 20th-century), critical theory, identity politics, and visual arts.

Known for challenging the "prevailing trends of postmodernist theory," Michaels has produced works connecting postmodernism, neoliberal capitalism, and socioeconomic inequality. Two of his best-known books are Our America: Nativism, Modernism and Pluralism (1995) and The Shape of the Signifier: 1967 to the End of History (2004)—the latter being adopted from his 2001 essay of the same name.

== Education and career ==
Michaels earned his BA from the University of California, Santa Barbara in 1970 and his PhD from the same institution in 1975. He taught at Johns Hopkins University from 1974 to 1977 and again from 1987 to 2001, and at the University of California, Berkeley, from 1977 to 1987. Since 2001, he has taught in the Department of English at the University of Illinois at Chicago. He was head of the department from 2001 to 2007.

"Against Theory", an article co-written by Michaels and Steven Knapp, is included in the Norton Anthology of Literary Criticism. His study of American Naturalism, The Gold Standard and the Logic of Naturalism, was published in 1988.

Michaels realized that three phenomena were happening around the same time, from 1967 onward. First, what was becoming fashionable in academia was a postmodernist current in literary theory. Following French theorist Roland Barthes, it asserted the "death of the author" and, in turn, the death of intended meaning. Second, a new form of liberal ideology, perhaps best expressed in Francis Fukuyama’s The End of History and the Last Man (1992), proclaimed the eternal victory of neoliberal capitalism. Lastly, social conditions in neoliberal capitalist economies were increasingly characterized by staggering inequality, whereby almost all gains were captured by an elite minority while the middle and working classes saw their real wages decline. These insights were first explored in his 2004 book, The Shape of the Signifier, adapted from his 2001 article in Critical Inquiry. Michaels claims that the death of "intentional meaning" as a result of the postmodern shift in literary theory has had the effect of depoliticizing the economic impoverishment that characterizes the modern era.

In The Beauty of a Social Problem, Michaels argues that there is a major disconnect between what neoliberalism is purportedly dedicated to — the equality of people’s various identities — and the economic inequality produced by capitalism, while postmodernism makes it impossible to criticize such outcomes as choices:

For once we think of the beholder as playing a role in the production of the work’s meaning, we replace the question of what the work means with the question of how it affects us. That is, we are no longer concerned with our interpretation of the work — our beliefs about what it says or does — we are concerned instead with our responses to the work, the effect it has on us or, in a more pragmatic vein, what we can do with it.… The transformation of differing interpretations into differing responses is thus one form of the effort to disarticulate difference from inequality. Correct interpretations are better than incorrect ones, but there is no such thing as a correct response and no (legitimate) reason therefore to think of any response as better than any other. And (as I argue in Shape), we can see in this refusal of disagreement the theoretical apparatus of an emerging politics of difference in which what becomes central is not the inequality of differing ideologies (i.e., different beliefs about what is true) but the equality of differing subject positions.

== Selected works ==
=== Essays ===
- 1982. "Against Theory" (with Steven Knapp), Critical Inquiry 8(4):723–42. JSTOR 1343194.
- 1987. "Against Theory 2: Hermeneutics and Deconstruction" (with Steven Knapp). Critical Inquiry 14(1):49–68. doi:10.2307/1343571. JSTOR 1343571.
- 2001. "The Shape of the Signifier." Critical Inquiry 27(2):266–83. JSTOR 1344250.
- 2006. "The Trouble With Diversity." The American Prospect (August 13, 2006).
- 2007. "The Death of a Beautiful Woman: Christopher Nolan's Idea of Form," Electronic Book Review.
- 2009. "Going Boom," Bookforum (February/March 2009).
- 2010. "IDENTITY POLITICS: A Zero-Sum Game." New Labor Forum 19(2):8–11. JSTOR 25701482.
- 2011. "Neoliberal Aesthetics: Fried, Ranciere and the Form of the Photograph," nonsite.org.
- 2011. "Interview on Photography and Politics," nonsite.org.
- 2012. "Meaning and Affect," nonsite.org.
- 2011. "The Beauty of a Social Problem (e.g. Unemployment)." Twentieth Century Literature 57(3/4):309–27. JSTOR 41698752.

=== Books ===
- 1988. The Gold Standard and the Logic of Naturalism. University of California Press: Berkeley.
- 1995. Our America: Nativism, Modernism and Pluralism. Durham: Duke University Press.
- 2004. The Shape of the Signifier: 1967 to the End of History. Princeton: Princeton University Press. ISBN 9780691126180. Lay summary.
- 2006. The Trouble with Diversity: How We Learned to Love Identity and Ignore Inequality. New York: Metropolitan. Introduction.
- 2015. The Beauty of a Social Problem: Photography, Autonomy, Economy. Chicago: University of Chicago Press. Lay summary.
- 2023. With Adolph Reed, No Politics but Class Politics. London: Eris Publishing. ISBN 9781912475575.

=== Interviews ===
- "Let Them Eat Diversity" (Jacobin, Winter 2011).
