= Pemberton's French Wine Coca =

Coca wine by John Pemberton

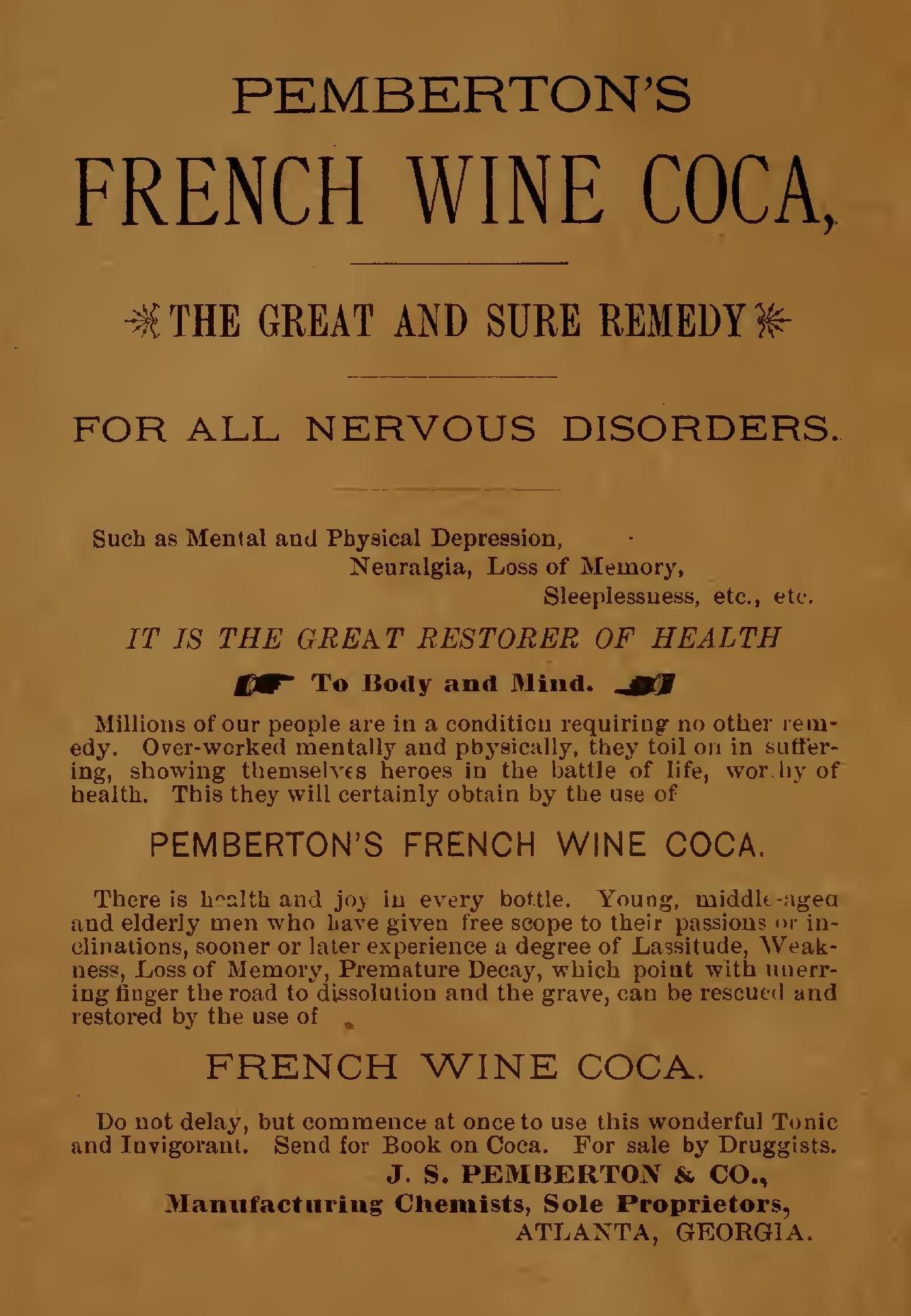
1885 advertisement

Pemberton's French Wine Coca was a coca wine created by the druggist John Pemberton, the inventor of Coca-Cola. It was an alcoholic beverage, mixed with coca, kola nut, and damiana. The original recipe contained the ingredient cocaethylene (cocaine mixed with alcohol), which was removed, just like the alcohol had before it, in 1899 because of a social stigma surrounding the rampant use of cocaine at the time.

== History ==
French Wine Coca is a combination of cocaethylene (a unique drug made by mixing cocaine and alcohol) and French wine.

In 1863, a Corsican chemist Angelo Mariani combined coca and wine and started selling it under the name "Vin Mariani". This became extremely popular. Jules Verne, Alexander Dumas, and Arthur Conan Doyle were among literary figures said to have used it, and the chief rabbi of France is quoted to have said, "Praise be to Mariani's wine!" Pope Leo XIII reportedly carried a flask of it regularly and gave Mariani a medal.

Seeing this commercial success, Dr. John Stith Pemberton in Columbus, Georgia – himself a morphine addict following an injury in the Civil War – set out to make his own version. He called it Pemberton's French Wine Coca and marketed it as a panacea. Among many fantastic claims, he called it "a most wonderful invigorator of the sexual organs".

In the 1880s, when former US president Ulysses S. Grant was writing his memoirs, he drank Pemberton's French Wine Coca to fight a painful throat cancer.

In an 1885 interview with the Atlanta Journal, Pemberton claimed the drink would benefit "scientists, scholars, poets, divines, lawyers, physicians, and others devoted to extreme mental exertion." In 1885, when Atlanta and Fulton County enacted temperance legislation, Pemberton scrambled to develop a non-alcoholic version of his popular product. The result was an early version of Coca-Cola. The temperance legislation did not affect the inclusion of coca, which remained in the formula until early into the 20th century, when it was removed under the orders of then-the Coca-Cola Company president Asa Candler; coca leaf extract with the cocaine removed remains one of the flavors in Coca-Cola.

Despite Atlanta's Temperance legislation, production of French Wine Coca continued until Pemberton's death in 1888; in 1887, French Wine Coca sold 720 bottles a day. The Coca-Cola recipe was eventually sold to Candler.

== Uses ==
Pemberton claimed astounding medicinal properties for his French Wine Coca, which was marketed as a patent medicine. French Wine Coca was marketed mostly to upper class intellectuals, afflicted with diseases believed to have been brought on by urbanization and Atlanta's increasingly competitive business environment. The beverage was advertised as a cure for nerve trouble, dyspepsia, gastroparesis, mental and physical exhaustion, gastric irritability, wasting diseases, constipation, headache, neurasthenia and impotence. It was also suggested as a cure for morphine addiction, which was increasingly common after the Civil War.
