= Franz Leopold Sonnenschein =

German chemist (1817–1879)

Franz Leopold Sonnenschein (13 July 1817 – 26 February 1879) was a German chemist from Cologne.

He taught himself pharmacy, and in the 1830s, established a small laboratory in Berlin. He worked with a physician as tutor for pharmacy students, readying them for their final exams. At the same time, he studied chemistry and in 1852 obtained his habilitation. He dedicated himself to analytic chemistry and involved himself in practical activities, for which he gained prestige. Many technical enterprises owed their success to him. He promoted analytic and judicial chemistry by numerous scientific investigations. From 1869 up until his death, he served as a professor at the University of Berlin.

Sonnenschein's reagent (phosphomolybdenic acid) is a reagent for alkaloids.

The scientist Friedrich Gaedcke is believed to have carried out his research in the private laboratory of Sonnenschein.

== Published works ==
His most notable works include:

- Anleitung zur chemischen Analyse ("Guide for Chemical Analysis") (1852).
- Anleitung zur quantitativen chemischen Analyse ("Guide for Quantitative Chemical Analysis") (1864).
- Handbuch der analytischen Chemie ("Manual of Analytic Chemistry") (1870–71).
- F.L. Sonnenschein's Handbuch der gerichtlichen chemie (new edition by Alexander Classen, 1881) ("Sonnenschein's manual of forensic chemistry").
