= Albert Niemann (chemist) =

German chemist (1834–1861)

- Born: 20 May 1834; Goslar, Kingdom of Hanover
- Died: 19 January 1861 (aged 26); Goslar, Kingdom of Hanover
- Education: University of Göttingen
- Known for: Isolating cocaine from coca leaves
- Scientific career
- Fields: Chemist
- Thesis: Über eine neue organische Base in den Cocablättern (1860)
- Doctoral advisor: Friedrich Wöhler

Albert Friedrich Emil Niemann (20 May 1834 – 19 January 1861) was a German chemist. In 1859 — about the same time as Paolo Mantegazza — he isolated cocaine, and he published his finding in 1860.

== Life ==
Niemann was born in Goslar, then in the Kingdom of Hanover, the son of a school principal. In 1849 he began an apprenticeship at the town hall pharmacy in Göttingen, where, starting in 1852, he was a Ph.D. student at the George August University.

=== Cocaine ===
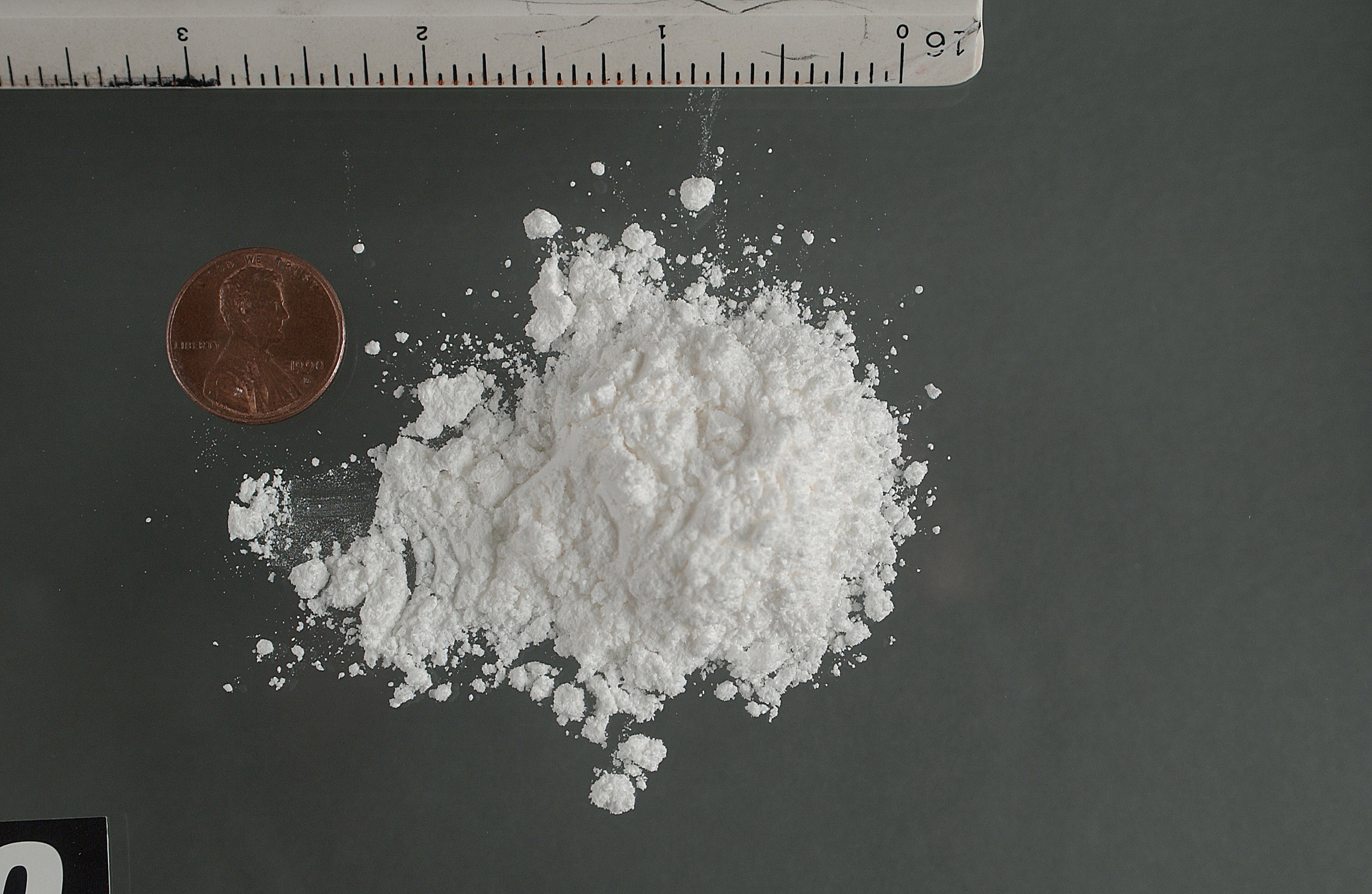
Niemann isolated cocaine from coca leaves in 1859.

In the 19th century, there was great interest among European chemists in the effects of coca leaves discovered in Latin America. In 1855 the chemist Friedrich Gaedcke had published a treatise on an active alkaloid extract of the coca leaf he called erythroxyline, after the genus Erythroxylum, from which cocaine-rich leaves are obtained. This extract was benzoylmethylecgonine, or cocaine, though it lacked in purity. He published a description in the journal Archiv der Pharmazie.

Friedrich Wöhler, Ordinary Professor of Chemistry at Göttingen University, had coca leaves imported to Germany by Karl von Scherzer, a member of the Austrian Novara expedition, and he gave those leaves to Niemann, his graduate student, to analyze. In 1859, Niemann isolated cocaine from coca leaves and then developed an improved purification process. He extracted the primary alkaloid and named the ingredient "cocaine" — as with other alkaloids, its name carried the “-ine” suffix (from Latin -ina). He wrote of the alkaloid's “colourless transparent prisms” and said that, “Its solutions have an alkaline reaction, a bitter taste, promote the flow of saliva and leave a peculiar numbness, followed by a sense of cold when applied to the tongue.” He published his finding in 1860 in his dissertation titled Über eine neue organische Base in den Cocablättern (On a New Organic Base in the Coca Leaves). This dissertation earned him his Ph.D. and was published in 1860 in the journal Archiv der Pharmazie.

=== Mustard gas ===
During experiments with ethylene and sulfur dichloride in 1860, Niemann produced mustard gas. He was among the first to document its toxic effects, but he might have not been the first to synthesize it. In 1860 and almost in parallel to Niemann, Frederick Guthrie reported the same reaction as Niemann. Guthrie also noted the toxic properties of mustard gas at that time.

In 1860, Niemann described the properties of mustard gas as: Sie besteht darin, daß selbst die geringste Spur, die zufallig auf irgend eine Stelle der Haut kommt, anfangs zwar keinen Schmerz hervorruft, nach Verlauf einiger Stunden aber eine Rötung derselben bewirkt und bis zum folgenden Tage eine Brandblase hervorbringt, die sehr lange eitert und außerordentlich schwer heilt, unter Hinterlassung starker Narben. (They are represented by the fact that, even traces brought into contact with the skin, while painless at first, result in a reddening of the skin after several hours, and in the following days produce blisters which fester and heal slowly and with great difficulty, leaving behind significant scarring.)

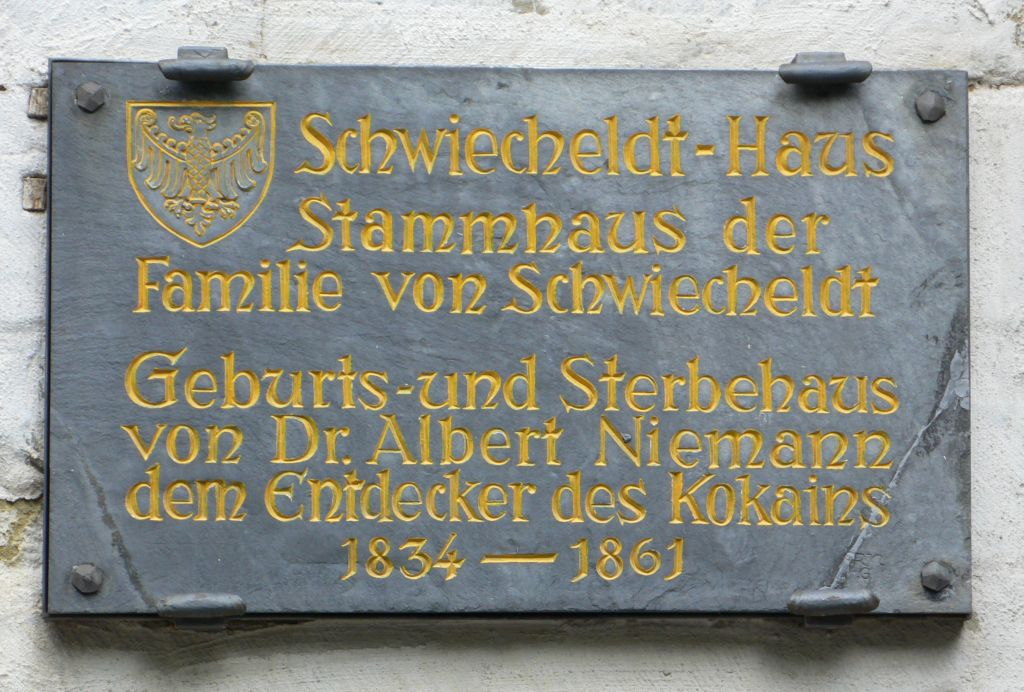
Memorial plaque in Goslar

== Death ==
Niemann died on 19 January 1861 in his hometown Goslar, reportedly of "suppuration of the lung". Niemann worked with mustard gas since 1860 and exposure to it probably resulted in his death. After his death, his colleague Wilhelm Lossen continued his investigations, and identified the chemical formula of cocaine in 1862.
