= Friedrich Gaedcke =

German chemist (1828–1890)

- Born: 5 June 1828
- Died: 19 September 1890 (aged 62)
- Known for: discovering cocaine
- Scientific career
- Fields: pharmaceutics

Friedrich Georg Carl (Friedrich) Gaedcke (5 June 1828 – 19 September 1890) was a German chemist. He was the first person to isolate the cocaine alkaloid in 1855.

== Life ==
Gaedcke worked in a pharmacy in Rostock and studied in Rostock between 1850 and 1851. In 1856, he took over a pharmacy in Dömitz which he ran for 34 years. He is described as having made contributions to the pharmaceutical history of Mecklenburg

=== Discovery of Cocaine ===
Working with coca leaves, Gaedcke isolated the cocaine molecule. Gaedcke named the alkaloid “erythroxyline,” and published a description in the journal Archiv der Pharmazie in 1855. He described the alkaloid as being of small crystal molecules with needle-like points on four to six sides. He reported the numbing effects of the molecule on himself following a small tongue test. Gaedcke's research received little attention at the time of its publication but would come to prominence a few years later following further work by Albert Niemann and scientists. He is believed to have carried out his research in the private laboratory of Franz Leopold Sonnenschein.
