= Angelo Mariani (chemist) =

French chemist (1838–1914)

- Ange-François Mariani
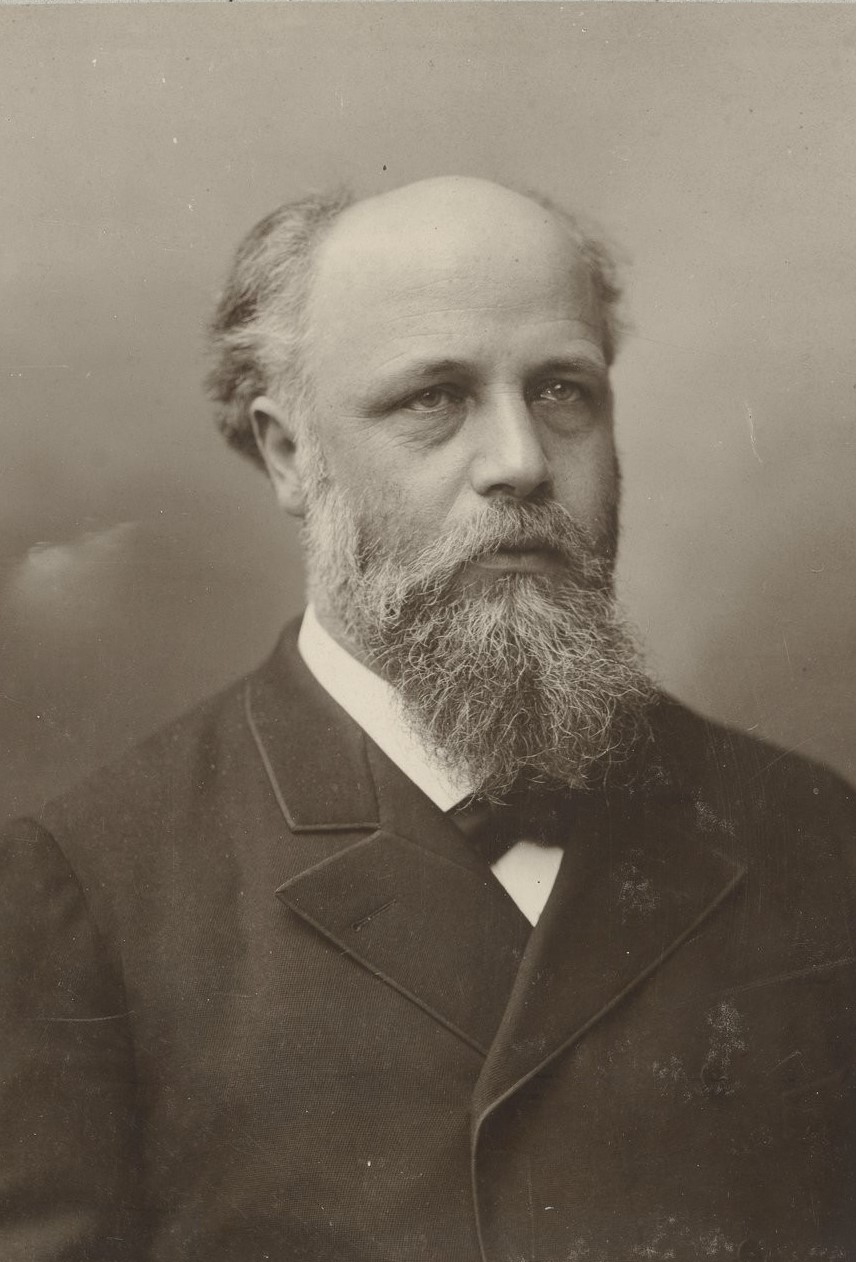
- Mariani, by Nadar, in 1900
- Born: Ange-François Mariani; 17 December 1838; Pero-Casevecchie, Haute-Corse, France
- Died: 1 April 1914 (aged 75)
- Known for: Inventor of the first coca wine
- Scientific career
- Fields: Pharmacy

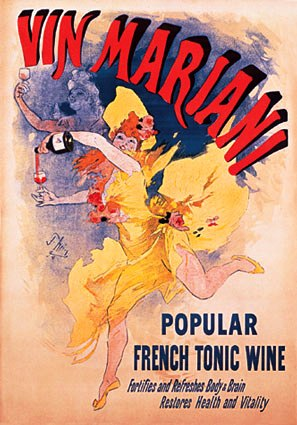
Advertising bill for the wine Mariani, lithograph by Jules Chéret, 1894

Angelo Mariani, born Ange-François Mariani (17 December 1838 – 1 April 1914) was a French pharmacy technician (assists the pharmacist in dispensing, preparation and administration), and entrepreneur from the island of Corsica. He was born in Pero-Casevecchie, Haute-Corse. A pharmacist is known as a chemist in Commonwealth English.

== Early life ==
Mariani was born on 17 December 1838 on the island of Corsica in France. His family consisted of wealthy healthcare workers.

== Career ==
He is best known as the inventor of the first coca wine, Vin Mariani, in 1863, made from Bordeaux wine and coca leaves. His contribution was to introduce the coca leaf indirectly to the general public. Mariani imported tons of coca leaves and used an extract from them in many products. It was Mariani's coca wine, though, that made him rich and famous. Mariani was also awarded with a medal of appreciation from Pope Leo XIII.

This tonic wine, Vin Mariani, has been described as an inspiration for John S. Pemberton's 1885 coca wine drink, Pemberton's French Wine Coca and the ancestor of Coca-Cola.

"Marketed as a 'brain-tonic', French Wine Coca was re-launched in 1886 as Coca-Cola"

== Works ==
- Mariani, Angelo (1896). Coca and its Therapeutic Application (3 ed.). New York: J. N. Jaros – via gutenberg.org. "Release date: February 21, 2015 [eBook #48328] Most recently updated: October 24, 2024" HTML
- Mariani, Angelo (1896). Coca and its Therapeutic Application (3 ed.). New York: J. N. Jaros – via archive.org. "Release date: February 21, 2015 (eBook #48328) Most recently updated: October 24, 2024" PDF
- Mariani, Angelo (1892). Coca and Its Therapeutic Application (2 ed.). New York: J. N. Jaros – via Google Books. pdf

== Advertisement ==
Advertorial: "The Pope Vigorous: Strong In Mini And Body". Baltimore American. Baltimore, Maryland. Feb 19, 1899. p. 28. "... ANGELO MARIANI. PARIS. FRANCE. Scientist, Chemist, Benefactor. Health is certainly tho desire of all creation. To tho thousands who have lost it or never knew Its delights a tonic that will rejuvenate the spirit and invigorate the body is ..."
