= Alexander Classen =

German chemist (1843–1934)

Alexander Classen (13 April 1843, in Aachen – 28 January 1934, in Aachen) was a German chemist, who is considered one of the founders of electrochemical analysis.

From 1861 he studied chemistry at the universities of Giessen and Berlin. In 1870 he became a lecturer of analytical chemistry at the polytechnic school in Aachen, where in 1882 he succeeded Hans Heinrich Landolt as professor of inorganic chemistry. At Aachen, he was appointed director of the Electrochemical Institute,

== Published works ==
He was the author of Quantitative Analyse durch Elektrolyse, a book that was published over numerous editions, and translated into English with the title: Quantitative analysis by electrolysis. He was editor of the last issue of Friedrich Mohr's textbook on titrimetry ("Friedrich Mohr's Lehrbuch der chemisch-analytischen Titrirmethode", 1914), and with English chemist Henry Enfield Roscoe, he authored a textbook on inorganic chemistry ("Lehrbuch der anorganischen Chemie"; 2 volumes, 3rd edition 1895–97). Other noted works by Classen are:

- Tabellen zur Qualitativen Analyse, 1876 – Tables for quantitative analysis.
- Grundriss der analytischen chemie (2 volumes, 2nd edition 1879) – Outline of analytical chemistry.
- F.L. Sonnenschein's Handbuch der gerichtlichen chemie (new edition of Franz Leopold Sonnenschein's manual of forensic chemistry, 1881).
- Handbuch der analytischen chemie (2 volumes, 4th edition 1889–91) – Handbook of analytical chemistry
- Neuerungen in der quantitativen Analyse durch Elektrolyse, 1895 – Innovations in quantitative analysis by electrolysis.
