= Karl von Scherzer =

Austrian explorer, diplomat, and scientist (1821–1903)

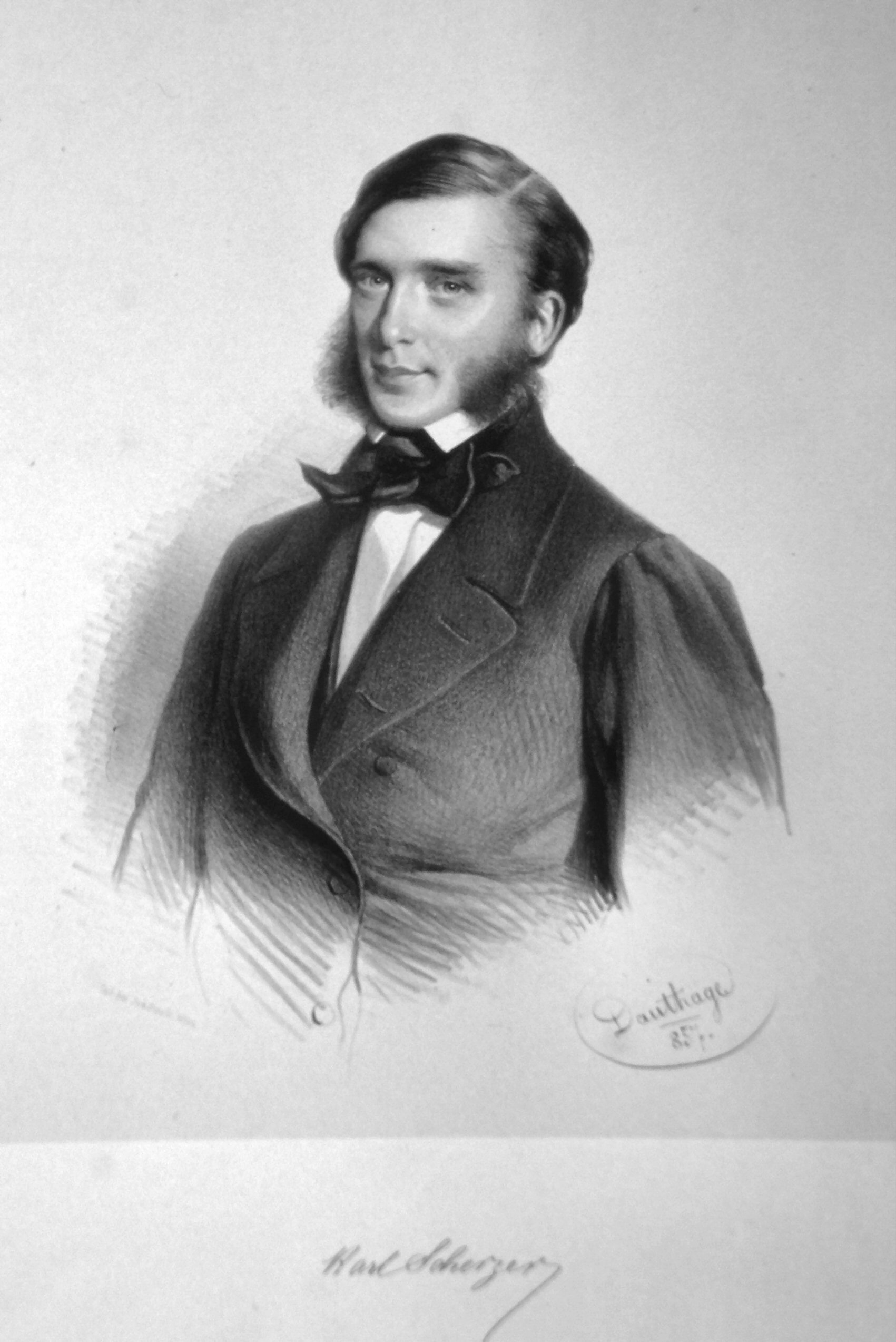
Karl von Scherzer, 1857

Karl Ritter von Scherzer (sometimes written Carl; 1 May 1821 in Vienna – 19 February 1903 in Görz (Note: modern-day Gorizia, Italy)) was an Austrian explorer, diplomat and natural scientist.

== Biography ==
He began his working life as a printer. After inheriting a fortune, Scherzer was able to travel extensively.

He took an active part in the 1848 revolution and was exiled to Italy in 1850. Here Scherzer became friends with German explorer and naturalist Moritz Wagner; together the men travelled through North and Central America and the West Indies (1852–1855).

After returning to Vienna, Scherzer, with the support of Archduke Maximilian, became a member of a scientific expedition traveling via the frigate Novara around the world. From that expedition he brought back enough coca leaves that Albert Niemann subsequently isolated cocaine.

After returning in 1859, Scherzer was appointed as a councillor of the board of trade, held an office in the bureau of foreign relations, and was tasked with compiling the commercial statistics of the empire. As a reward for his publications, Scherzer was knighted in 1866. During 1869 he was the leader of an expedition to eastern Asia.

Afterwards he served as a diplomatic consul in several places, including Smyrna (today's İzmir). In 1886 Scherzer retired.

== Books ==
- Reisen in Nordamerika in den Jahren 1852 und 1853. (Travels in North America during 1852 and 1853), 3 parts, Arnold, Leipzig, 1854. Written together with Moritz Wagner.
- Las Historias del origen de los Indios de Guatemala, par el R. P. F. Francisco Ximenes. Vienna, 1856. Copy of the Spanish translation of the Popol Vuh manuscript (more details).
- Wanderungen Durch die Mittel-Amerikanischen Freistaaten Nicaragua, Honduras und San Salvador ("Travels through Central American States of Nicaragua, Honduras and San Salvador"), Braunschweig George Westermann, 1857. Details of the 1852 - 1855 expedition.
- Reise der österreichischen Fregatte Novara um die Erde, in den Jahren 1857 - 1859 ("Narrative of the circumnavigation of the globe by the Austrian frigate Novarra"), Vienna, 1861 - 1862, three volumes, with illustrations. First English edition by London Saunders, Otley, And Co. 1861.
- Aus dem Natur- und Völkerleben im tropischen Amerika. ("About the nature and the life of people in tropic America"), Leipzig, Wigand Verlag, 1864.
- Statistisch-commerzielle Ergebnisse einer Reise um die Erde, unternommen an Bord der österreichischen Fregatte Novara in den Jahren 1857-1859. ("Statistical and commercial results of the circumnaviagation of the globe, written on the board of Austrian frigate Novara during 1857-1859"), F.A. Brockhaus, Leipzig 1867.
- Fachmannische Berichte über die Osterreichische-Ungarische Expedition nach Siam, China und Japan (1868-1871) ("Scholarly report about the Austro-Hungarian expedition to Siam, China and Japan (1868-1871)"), Stuttgart, Verlag von Julius Maier, 1872.
- Smyrna ("Smyrna"), Vienna, 1873. A monograph about the city.
- Das wirthschaftliche Leben der Völker. Ein Handbuch über Production und Consum. ("Economic life of nations. Handbook of production and consumption."), Leipzig, Dürr, 1885.

== Sources ==
- Wilson, J. G.; Fiske, J., eds. (1900). "Scherzer, Karl von" . Appletons' Cyclopædia of American Biography. New York: D. Appleton.
