= Vin Mariani =

Coca wine and patent medicine of the 1860s

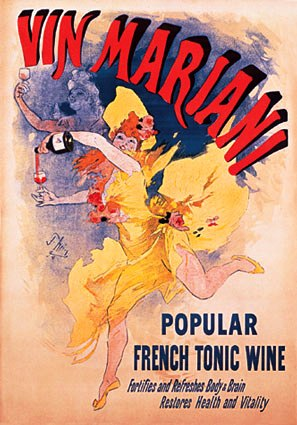
- Advertising bill for the wine Mariani, lithograph of Jules Chéret, 1894
- Type: Coca wine
- Introduced: 1863; 162 years ago
- Related products: Coca-Cola
- Website: cocamariani.com

Vin Mariani (French: Mariani wine) was a coca wine and patent medicine created in the 1860s by Angelo Mariani, a French chemist from the island of Corsica. Mariani became intrigued with coca and its medical and economic potential after reading Paolo Mantegazza's paper on the effects of coca. Between 1863 and 1868 Mariani started marketing a coca wine called Vin Tonique Mariani (à la Coca du Pérou) which was made from Bordeaux wine and coca leaves.

The ethanol in the wine acted as a solvent and extracted the cocaine from the coca leaves. It originally contained 6 mg of cocaine per fluid ounce of wine (211.2 mg/L), but Vin Mariani that was to be exported contained 7.2 mg per ounce (253.4 mg/L), in order to compete with the higher cocaine content of similar drinks in the United States. Advertisements for Vin Mariani claimed that it would restore health, strength, energy and vitality.

== Promotion and testimonials ==
Mariani marketed Vin Mariani for a number of ailments, touting its ability to increase energy, appetite and mood. It was promoted as a performance enhancer for creatives and athletes alike, and was endorsed by many notable people of its time. Mariani solicited testimonials from a broad range of European celebrities, including members of various royal families, politicians, artists, writers and other household names, and reprinted them in newspapers and magazines as advertisements. He claimed to have collected over four thousand such endorsements.

Pope Leo XIII and later Pope Pius X were both Vin Mariani drinkers. Pope Leo appeared on a poster endorsing the wine and awarded a Vatican gold medal to Mariani for creating it. Thomas Edison claimed it helped him stay awake longer. Ulysses S. Grant drank Vin Mariani while writing his memoirs towards the end of his life. Jules Méline, the French prime minister, drank the wine despite being otherwise anti-alcohol.

Other notables who endorsed Vin Mariani include Kyrle Bellew, Émile Zola, Victorien Sardou, Henri Rochefort and Charles Gounod, all of whom wrote testimonials that appeared as Vin Mariani advertisements. Actresses, dancers, and singers, including Adelina Patti, Emma Albani, Sarah Bernhardt, Emma Eames, Rosita Mauri, Lillian Russell, Emma Juch, Louise Paullin, Zélie de Lussan, Marie Tempest, Madeleine Lucette Ryley, and Augusta Holmès also endorsed Vin Mariani in print testimonials.

== Inspiration for Coca-Cola ==
Vin Mariani was apparently an inspiration for John S. Pemberton's 1885 coca wine drink, Pemberton's French Wine Coca. Pemberton's recipe was very similar to that of Vin Mariani, including the coca leaves. It was differentiated only by the inclusion of the African kola nut, the beverage's source of caffeine. Later that year, when Atlanta and Fulton County, Georgia, passed prohibition legislation, Pemberton responded by developing a carbonated, non-alcoholic version of his French Wine Coca. He called the reformulated beverage Coca-Cola, for its stimulant ingredients coca leaves and kola nuts.

== Modern developments ==
Angelo Mariani failed to pass his recipe down to subsequent Mariani family generations, so Vin Mariani went out of production after his death. The product was relaunched in 2014 by Christophe Mariani (no relation). Christophe Mariani subsequently met the Bolivian president, Evo Morales, in Rome to discuss the commercialisation of Mariani cocaine in Bolivia.

== Gallery ==
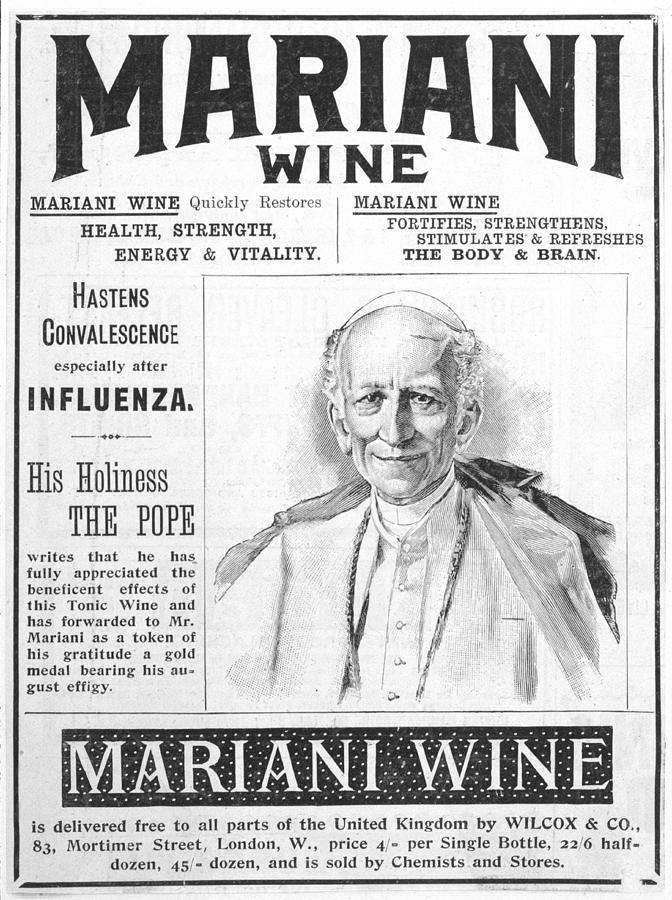
Pope Leo XIII purportedly carried a hipflask of Vin Mariani with him, and awarded a Vatican gold medal to Angelo Mariani.

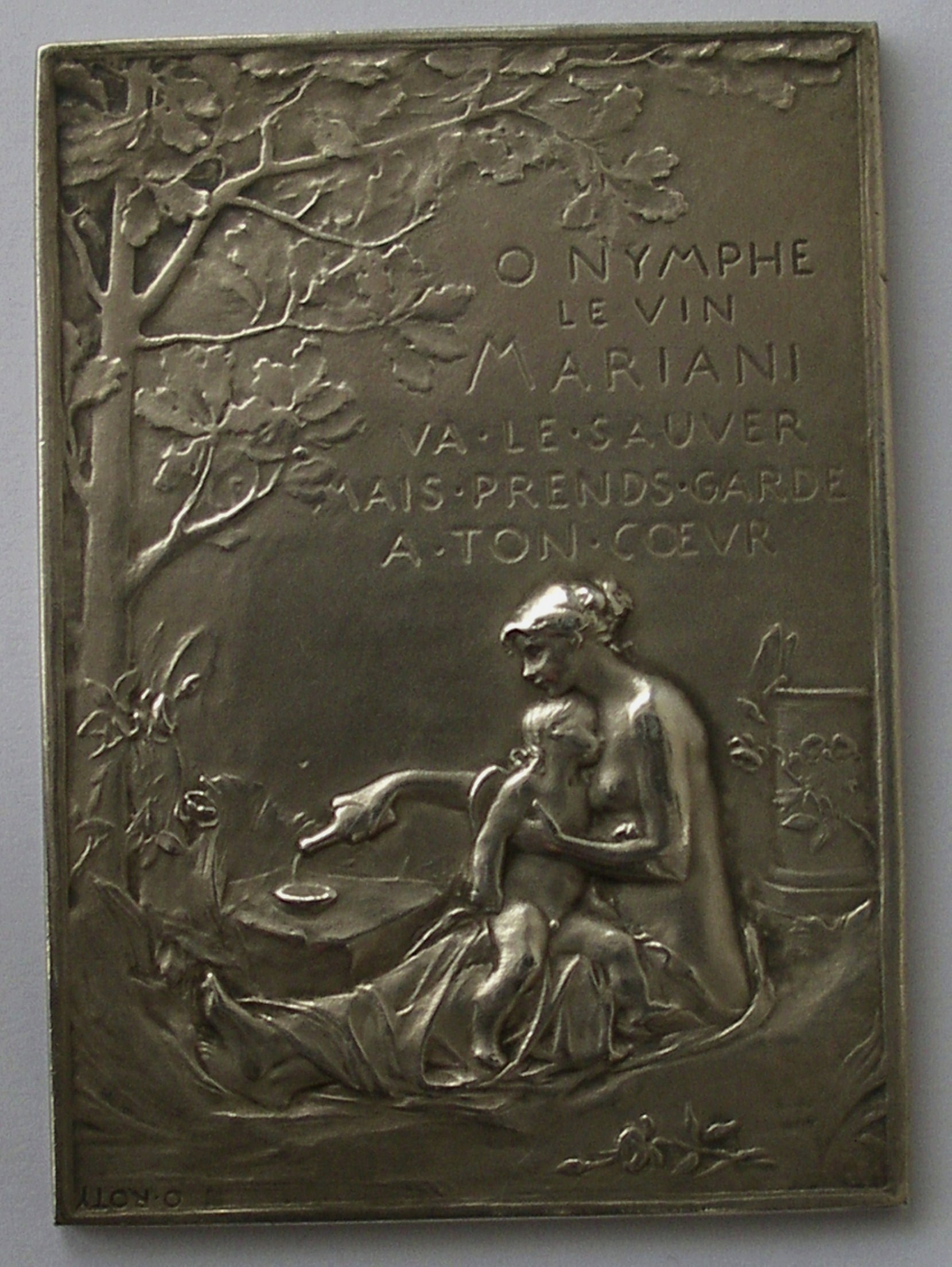
Vin Mariani medal by Louis-Oscar Roty

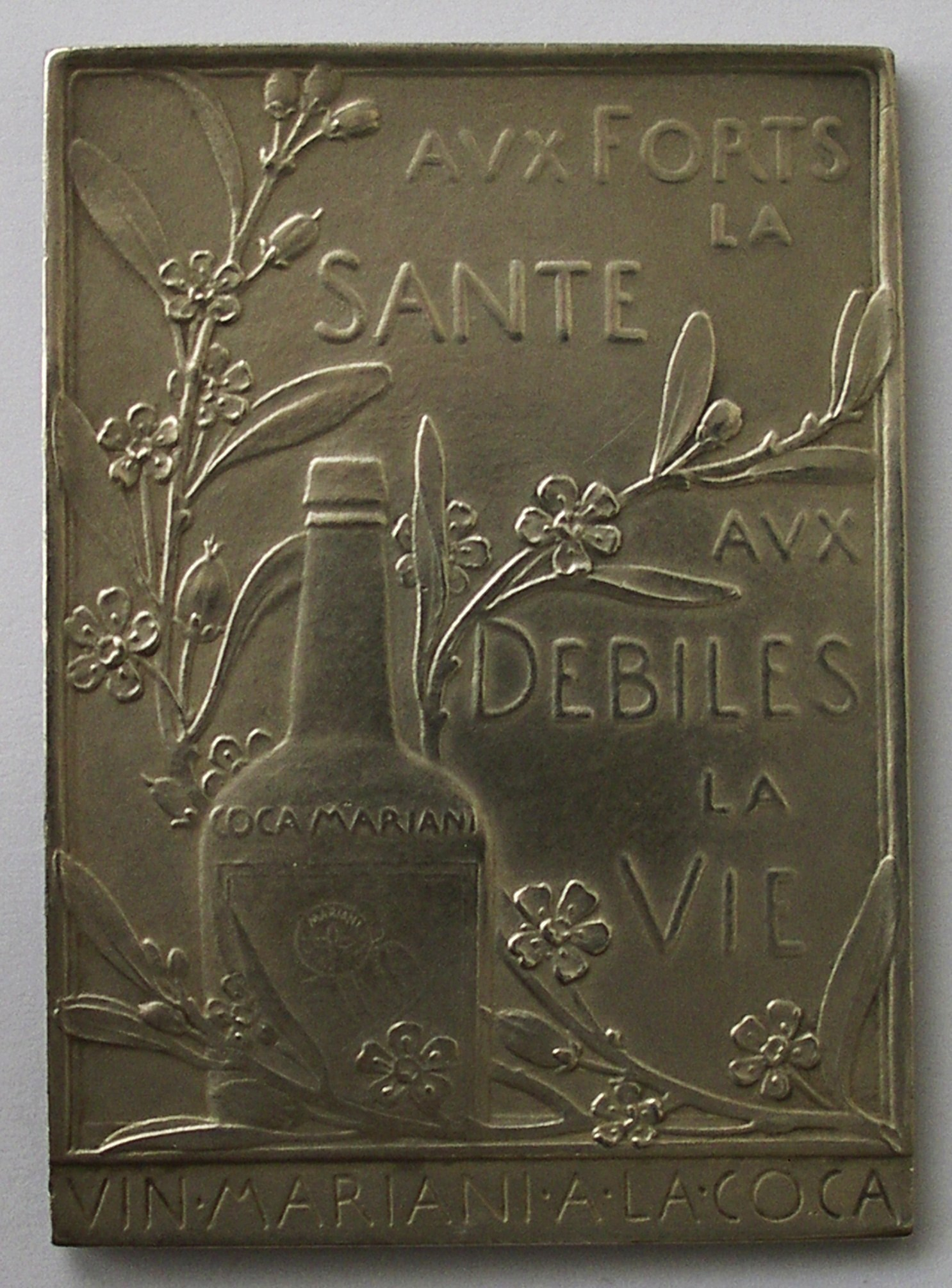
Medal of Coca Mariani wine

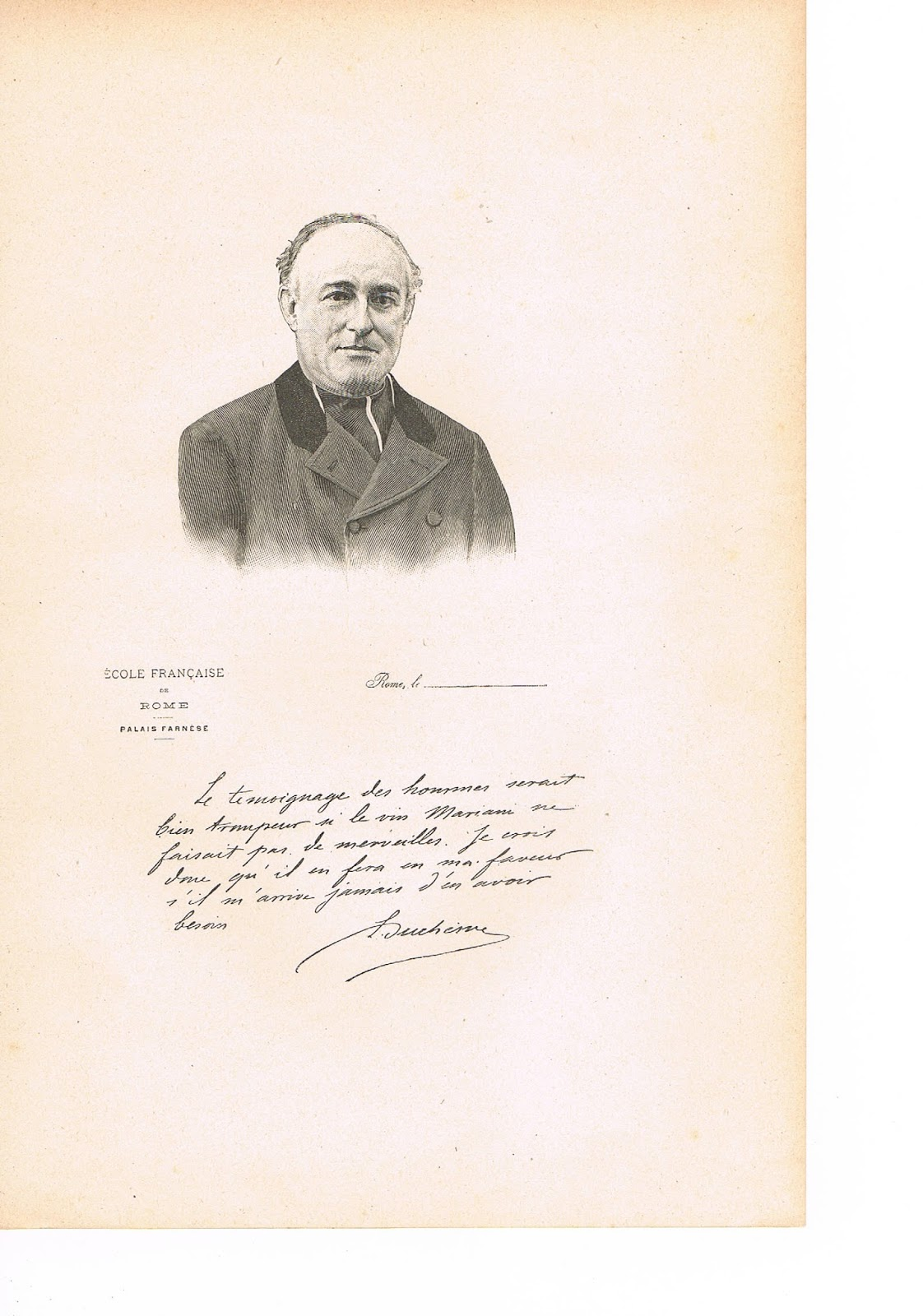
French historian Louis Duchesne and Vin Mariani

== See also ==
- Cocaethylene, a compound produced by human metabolism from combination of alcohol and cocaine
