= The Gold Standard and the Logic of Naturalism =

1988 book by Walter Benn Michaels

The Gold Standard and the Logic of Naturalism: American Literature at the Turn of the Century
- Author: Walter Benn Michaels
- Series: The New Historicism: Studies in Cultural Poetics
- Publisher: University of California Press
- Publication date: 1 November 1988
- Publication place: United States
- Pages: 264
- ISBN: 978-0520059825

The Gold Standard and the Logic of Naturalism is a non-fiction book written by literary theorist and author Walter Benn Michaels and first published in 1988 by the University of California Press. (Note: The text first appeared in article form in Benn Michaels, Walter (1985). "The Gold Standard and the Logic of Naturalism". Representations. 9 (9). University of California Press: 105–132. doi:10.2307/3043767. JSTOR 3043767.)

== Content ==
The book is a treatise on capitalism in the United States and "value creation," by way of literary criticism. The author examines topics such as the alienation of property, the proclivity for masochism, and the battle over free silver, analyzing the cultural forms these phenomena affect and shape. Michaels proclaims a social, economic, and legal examination of literary history, because, as he affirms, if literature is to be understood at all it must be understood both as "a producer and a product of market capitalism."

== Reviews ==
The New York Times, reporting in 1986, on Representations, "one of the hottest newer journals around," focused on its issue devoted to American culture between the Civil War and World War I, which, they claimed, shattered "the shackles of narrow specialization." The report denotes The Gold Standard as a "literary-psychological-economic study" of misers, which brings to relief the fiction of Frank Norris in particular. The work focuses simultaneously on literature and the arts, as well as on politics and the "historical fabric of the era."

Professor Jon Dietrick writes that, in The Gold Standard, the author locates in American literary naturalism an anxiety over issues of material reality and representation. The "logic" of naturalism he elaborates is based on the repression of money as a "free-floating signifier," expressing itself in various, unsuccessful strategies of "escaping" the money economy. Michaels, he states, claims that naturalism, as an aesthetic expression of both the desire for and the impossibility of this escape, obsesses over the ontological and epistemological questions raised by money, and becomes the working out of a set of "conflicts between pretty things and curious ones, material and representation, hard money and soft, beast and soul."

Ira Wells, University of Toronto Academic Programs director, in his work Fighting Words, seeks a new understanding of what literary naturalism is and why it matters. He countered the accepted view of literary naturalism being concerned with environmental and philosophical determinism and focused on the polemical essence of the genre. Naturalist writers, he argues, are "united less by a coherent philosophy than by an attitude, a posture of aggressive controversy, which happens to cluster loosely around particular social issues." Wells cites H. L. Mencken as among the first critics who found naturalism to be merely an "aesthetic assault" on the social realism practiced by the likes of William Dean Howells, a stance that framed naturalism as America's "national literature of disobedience."

The new historicists, such as Michaels, Wells continues, reinvigorated naturalism through their recognition of important categories worthy of study, and particularly the combined interest in gender and economics. In this endeavor, Wells identifies Michaels' naturalism as attacking capitalism itself. In The Gold Standard specifically, he claims that Michaels outlines two gendered models of Gilded Age writing: a kind of "feminine consumption and masculine production." The naturalists, Wells claims, may have conceived of their project as one of opposition to "consumer culture," but, by championing masculine production over feminine consumption, their turn-of-the-century naturalism ended up "endorsing, rather than undermining, the dominant economic logic of the age."

Literary critic, philosopher, and political theorist Fredric Jameson relates how Michaels, in the book, has given himself over so completely to the logic of its content and the "inner dynamic of [its] objects" that the great problems of that age and ours appear not summoned but under their own momentum. (Note: Jameson lauds the book as follows: "Few recent works of American criticism display [its] interpretive brilliance and intellectual energy.") Michael's reading, Jameson, contends, allows him to set in place the analysis of the gold standard itself, which refers to the "passionate and obsessive belief" in the natural, the intrinsic value of gold, a notion that expresses the longing to escape the market and its idiosyncratic instabilities. For Michaels, the reviewer notes, the aesthetic consequences of the debate over nature, gold, and authenticity find their expression in the critique of representation as such. Jameson quotes Michaels' aside on trompe l'oeil:

The painting that can represent nothing and still remains a painting is 'money itself', and the modernist (or, perhaps, literalist) aesthetic of freedom from representation is a gold bug aesthetic.

For The Gold Standard author, states Jameson, everything comes down to the "self" and the "desperate or passionate fantasies" of productionism, romance, slavery, masochism, the gold standard itself, and hoarding or spending are all attempts to deal with the antinomy of the self as private property. Michaels identifies what is "the true Other of the market" and of commodity consumption, namely death itself. And shows that the force of desire, alleged by a plethora of authors and polemicists to undermine the rigidities of late capitalism is, actually, precisely what keeps the consumer system intact: The so-called "disruptive element" in desire is not subversive of the capitalism system but "constitutive of its power." In terms of politics and ideologies, all the radical positions of the past are flawed because they failed. But, Jameson points out, Walter Benjamin always insisted that history progresses by failure rather than by success. In fact, he states, it is clear that the more corrupt and evil the existing order is, the less likely for anything better to emerge from it. And as to dialectics as a language experiment pertinent to Michaels' endeavor in this work, Jameson quotes extensively from Jean-Jacques Rousseau's Emile, or On Education: (Note: Nonetheless, Rousseau contributed numerous articles to Diderot & D'Alembert's Encyclopédie, among which was one on political economy.)

No language is rich enough to furnish as many terms, turns of phrase, or sentence-types, as our ideas have modifications. Splendid but unpractical is the method that consists in defining all the terms, and ceaselessly substituting the definition of the term thereby defined; for how can this avoid circularity?

== See also ==
- Post-structuralism
- Post-modernism
- Immanance
