= Agwa de Bolivia =

Liqueur

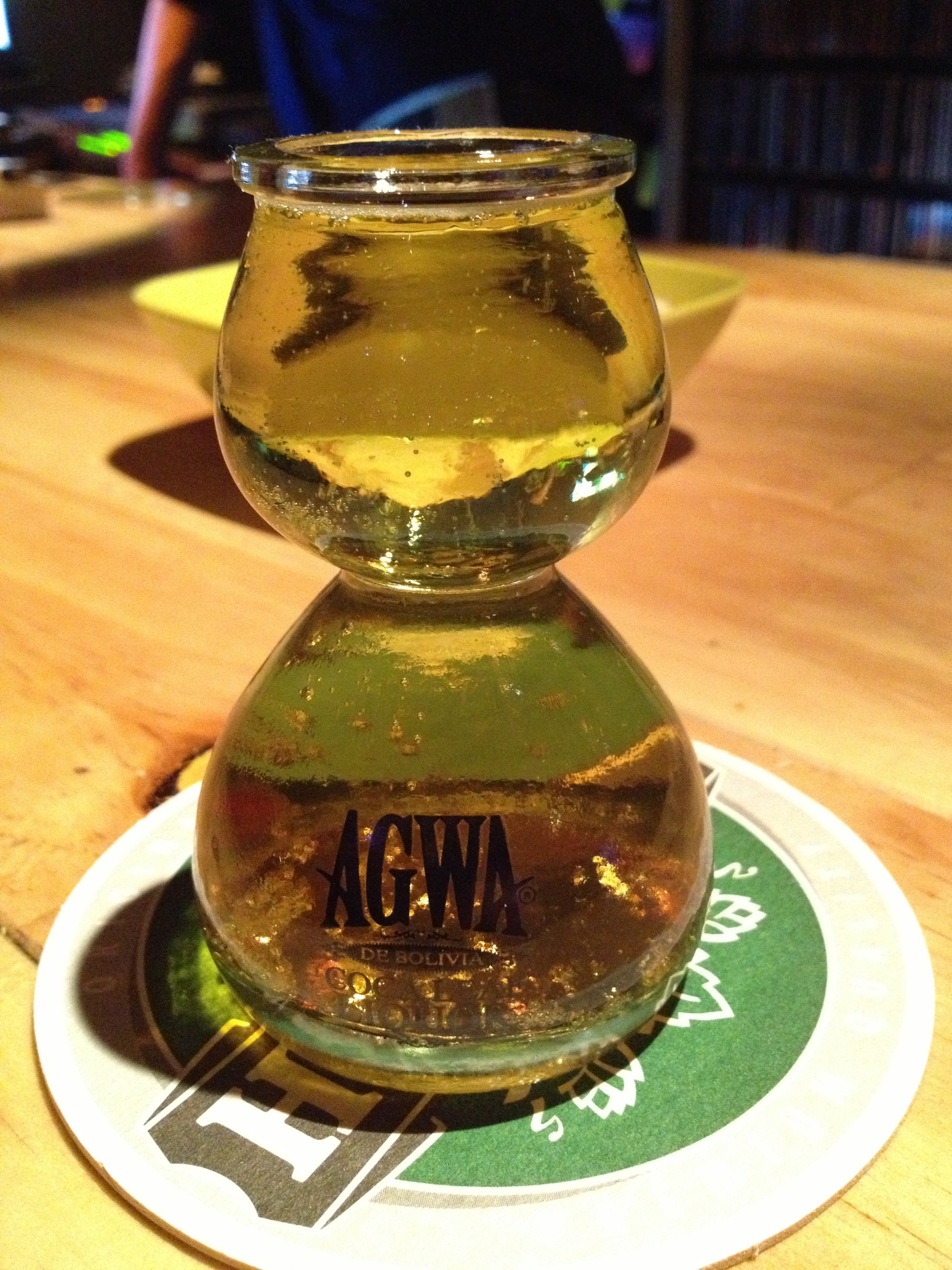
Agwa bomb at a bar in Itaewon, Seoul

Agwa de Bolivia, often shortened to AGWA, is a herbal liqueur made with Bolivian coca leaves and 37 other natural herbs and botanicals including green tea, ginseng, and guarana, distilled and produced in Amsterdam by BABCO Europe Limited. The coca leaf content of the drink, like that in Coca-Cola, has the cocaine alkaloids removed during production, and does not contain the drug.

== History ==
While the coca leaf has been used for thousands of years by the native South American population in the Andean region, traditional uses typically have included chewing the leaf or brewing it into tea. The distillation of coca leaf liqueur is more recent, likely dating to the early-to-mid 1800s.

Agwa de Bolivia emerged commercially around 2000, first appearing in Toronto, before spreading through other parts of Canada, Europe, and the United States by 2004.

== Production ==
BABCO states that the leaves used for the production of AGWA are picked at 2000 meters above sea level in the Bolivian Andes. The leaves are then shipped to Amsterdam, where they are macerated into a tea extract and then distilled to a strength of 82% alc./vol. This distillation process naturally removes the plant's psychotropic effects. The final AGWA herbal liqueur is marketed as a blend of the coca distillate with 36 other botanical elements including: African mint, French lavender, red ginseng, guarana, green tea, juniper, cinnamon, bitter orange, yerba mate, and maca root powder.

== Legality ==
Agwa de Bolivia has been approved for consumption by the European Union Narcotics commission, U.S. Food and Drug Administration, and TTB (Homeland security finished liquid & label).

== Awards ==
- 2009 Silver (best in class) award in the herbal liqueur class at the International Wine and Spirit Awards.
- 2011 Silver Medal in the herbal liqueur class at the San Francisco World Spirits Competition.

== See also ==
- Vin Mariani
- Amerte (coca leaf gin)
- Coca Buton
