= Coca wine =

Type of alcoholic beverage

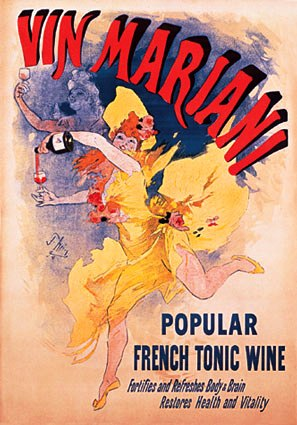
- Type: Wine
- Origin: France
- Introduced: 1863

Coca wine is an alcoholic beverage combining wine with cocaine. One popular brand was Vin Mariani, developed in 1863 by French chemist and entrepreneur Angelo Mariani.

At the end of the 19th century, the fear of drug abuse made coca-based drinks less popular. This led to the prohibition of cocaine in the United States in 1914 via the Harrison Narcotics Tax Act, and the removal of cocaine from coca wine, though coca leaf remained. Coca wine itself became illegal in the United States when its other main drug, alcohol, was banned just a few years later with the Eighteenth Amendment in 1920.

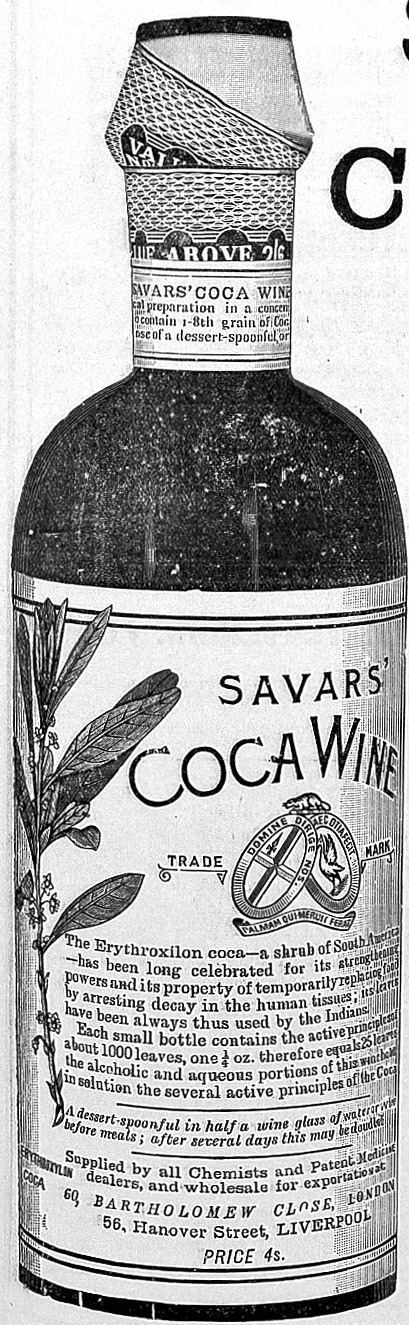
Savar's Coca Wine

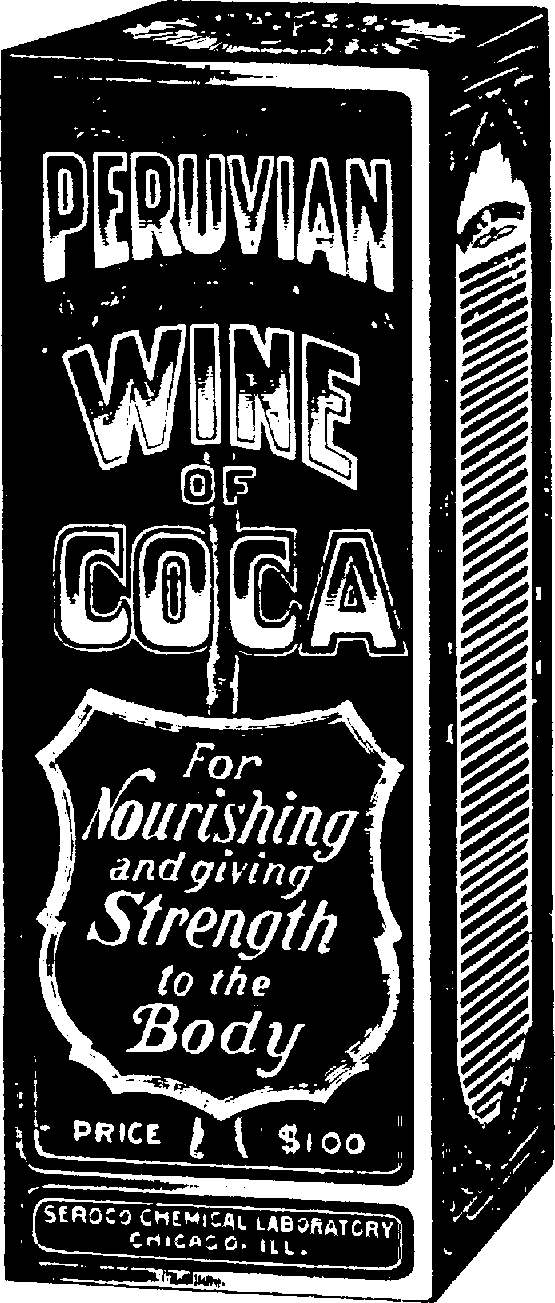
Peruvian Wine of Coca

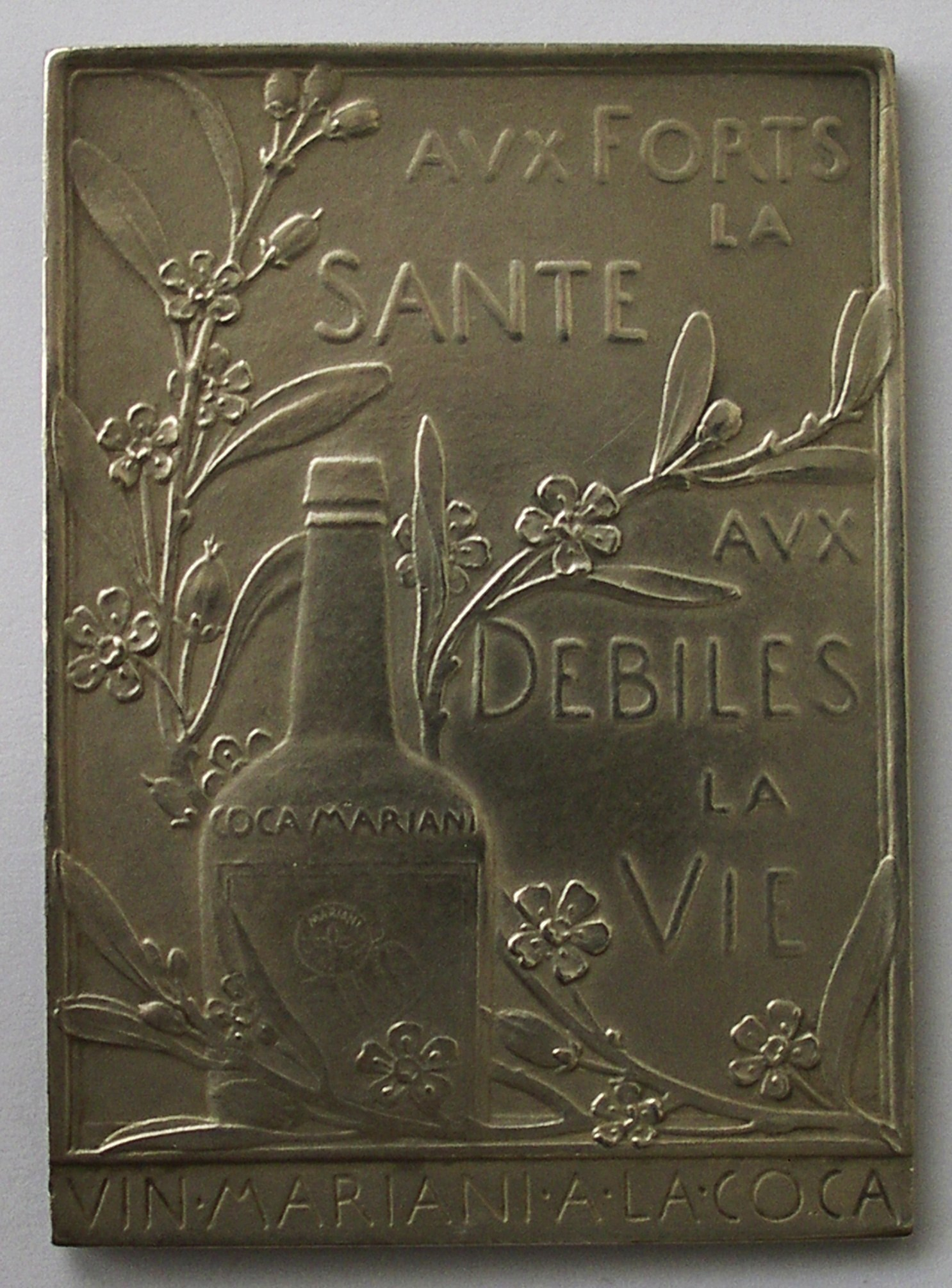
Coca Mariani medal by Louis-Oscar Roty

== Related beverages ==
In Atlanta, John Pemberton, a pharmacist, developed a beverage based on Vin Mariani, called Pemberton's French Wine Coca. It proved popular among American consumers. In 1886, when Georgia introduced Prohibition, Pemberton had to replace the wine in his recipe with non-alcoholic syrup. The new recipe became Coca-Cola.

== Physiological effects ==
The combination of cocaine and alcohol leads to the formation of cocaethylene in the body. Studies suggest the compound decreases the feelings of drunkenness from alcohol alone and heightens euphoric sensations, but is also potentially cardiotoxic, more so than either cocaine or alcohol alone.
