= On a New Organic Base in the Coca Leaves =

On a New Organic Base in the Coca Leaves is an 1860 dissertation written by Albert Niemann. Its title in German is Über eine neue organische Base in den Cocablättern. The piece describes, in detail, how Niemann isolated cocaine, a crystalline alkaloid. It also earned Niemann his Ph.D., and is now in the British Library. He wrote of the alkaloid's "colourless transparent prisms" and said that, "Its solutions have an alkaline reaction, a bitter taste, promote the flow of saliva and leave a peculiar numbness, followed by a sense of cold when applied to the tongue." Niemann named the alkaloid "cocaine" — as with other alkaloids its name carried the "-ine" suffix.
