= Archiv der Pharmazie =

- Discipline: Pharmaceutical and medicinal chemistry
- Language: English
- Edited by: Andreas Link

Publication details
- Former name: Archiv der Pharmazie und Berichte der Deutschen Pharmazeutischen Gesellschaft
- History: 1822-present
- Publisher: Wiley-VCH (Germany)
- Frequency: Monthly
- Open access: Hybrid
- Impact factor: 5.1 (2022)

Standard abbreviations
- ISO 4: Arch. Pharm.
- NLM: Arch Pharm (Weinheim)

Indexing
- CODEN: ARPMAS
- ISSN: 0365-6233 (print); 1521-4184 (web)
- LCCN: 2004233482
- OCLC no.: 1129689000
- Archiv der Pharmazie und Berichte der Deutschen Pharmazeutischen Gesellschaft
- CODEN: APBDAJ
- ISSN: 0342-9385
- LCCN: 2002205557

Links
- Journal homepage; Online access; Online archive

The Archiv der Pharmazie (German pronunciation: [ˈ arˈçiːf ˈdeːɐ̯ farmaˈtsiː], English: Archive of Pharmacy) is a monthly peer-reviewed scientific journal covering all aspects of chemistry in the life sciences. The journal was established in 1822 and is published by Wiley-VCH on behalf of the Deutsche Pharmazeutische Gesellschaft; it is the oldest German pharmaceutical journal still in publication. Until 2019, the editor-in-chief was Holger Stark (Heinrich Heine University Düsseldorf). He was succeeded in 2020 by Andreas Link (University of Greifswald).

== History ==
The first edition appeared in 1822 under the name Archiv des Apothekervereins im nördlichen Teutschland für die Pharmacie und ihre Huelfswissenschaften (English: Archive of the Pharmacists' Association in Northern Germany for Pharmacy and its Auxiliary Sciences). In 1832, the journal was merged with Liebigs Annalen (then known as Annalen der Pharmacie), but would split from it following editorial disputes between the editors Justus von Liebig and Rudolph Brandes. From 1924 (volume 242) the journal was called Archiv der Pharmazie und Berichte der Deutschen Pharmazeutischen Gesellschaft (English: Archive of Pharmacy and Reports from the German Pharmaceutical Society), before obtaining its current name in 1971.

In 1995 the publication language changed from German to English.

== Abstracting and indexing ==
The journal is abstracted and indexed in:

- Biological Abstracts
- BIOSIS Previews
- CAB Abstracts
- Chemical Abstracts Service
- Current Contents/Life Sciences
- Embase
- Index Medicus/MEDLINE/PubMed
- Science Citation Index Expanded
- Scopus

According to the Journal Citation Reports, the journal has a 2022 impact factor of 5.1.
