= John Stith Pemberton =

American pharmacist, inventor of Coca-Cola (1831–1888)

John Pemberton
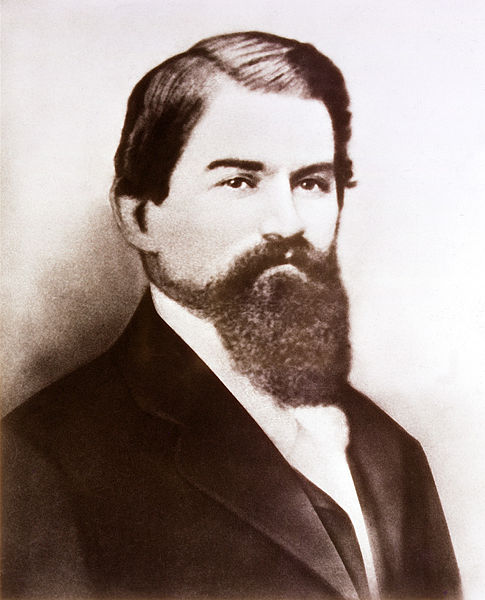
- Pemberton, before 1888
- Born: July 8, 1831; Knoxville, Georgia, U.S.
- Died: August 16, 1888 (aged 57); Atlanta, Georgia, U.S.
- Resting place: Old City Cemetery
- Education: Reform Medical College of Georgia
- Occupation: Pharmacist
- Known for: Inventor of Coca-Cola
- Spouse: Ann Eliza Clifford Lewis
- Children: Charles Nay Pemberton
- Military career
- Branch: Confederate States Army
- Service years: 1861–1865
- Rank: Lieutenant Colonel
- Unit: Third Cavalry Battalion of the Georgia State Guard
- Conflicts: American Civil War: Battle of Columbus (WIA)

John Stith Pemberton (July 8, 1831 – August 16, 1888) was an American pharmacist, chemist, and Confederate States Army officer who is best known as the inventor of Coca-Cola. On May 8, 1886, he developed an early version of a beverage that would later become Coca-Cola, but sold the rights to Asa Griggs Candler for roughly $2300 (equivalent to $82,417 in 2025) shortly before his death in 1888.

Pemberton suffered from a sabre wound sustained in April 1865, during the Battle of Columbus. His efforts to control his chronic pain led to morphine addiction. In an attempt to curb his addiction he began to experiment with various painkillers and toxins. The development of an earlier beverage blending alcohol and cocaine led to the recipe that later was adapted to make Coca-Cola.

== Background ==
Pemberton was born on July 8, 1831, in Knoxville, Georgia, and spent most of his childhood in Rome, Georgia. His parents were James C. Pemberton and Martha L. Gant.

Pemberton entered the Reform Medical College of Georgia in Macon, Georgia, and in 1850, at the age of nineteen, he earned his medical degree. His main talent was chemistry. After initially practicing some medicine and surgery, Pemberton opened a drug store in Columbus.

During the American Civil War, Pemberton served in the Third Cavalry Battalion of the Georgia State Guard, which was at that time a component of the Confederate Army. He achieved the rank of lieutenant colonel.

== Personal life ==
Pemberton met Ann Eliza Clifford Lewis of Columbus, Georgia, known to her friends as "Cliff", who had been a student at Wesleyan College in Macon. They were married in Columbus in 1853. Their only child, Charles Nay Pemberton, was born in 1854.

They lived in a Victorian cottage, the Pemberton House in Columbus, a home of historic significance which was added to the National Register of Historic Places on September 28, 1971.

== Founding Coca-Cola ==
In April 1865, Pemberton sustained a sabre wound to the chest during the Battle of Columbus. He soon became addicted to the morphine used to ease his pain.

In 1866, seeking a cure for his addiction, he began to experiment with painkillers that would serve as morphine-free alternatives. His first recipe was "Dr. Tuggle's Compound Syrup of Globe Flower", in which the active ingredient was derived from the buttonbush (Cephalanthus occidentalis), a toxic plant. He next began experimenting with coca and coca wines, eventually creating a recipe that contained extracts of kola nut and damiana, which he called Pemberton's French Wine Coca.

According to Coca-Cola historian Phil Mooney, Pemberton's world-famous soda was created in Columbus, Georgia, and carried to Atlanta. With public concern about drug addiction, depression, and alcoholism among war veterans, and "neurasthenia" among "highly-strung" Southern women, Pemberton's "medicine" was advertised as particularly beneficial for "ladies, and all those whose sedentary employment causes nervous prostration".

In 1886, when Atlanta and Fulton County enacted temperance legislation, Pemberton had to produce a non-alcoholic alternative to his French Wine Coca. Pemberton relied on Atlanta drugstore owner-proprietor Willis E. Venable to test, and help him perfect, the recipe for the beverage, which he formulated by trial and error. With Venable's assistance, Pemberton worked out a set of directions for its preparation.

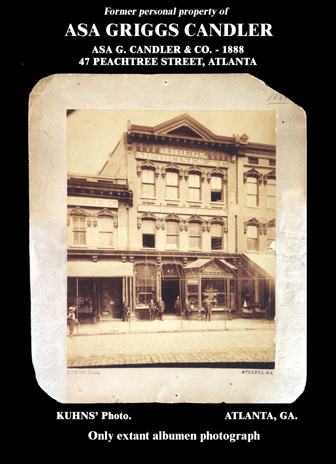
Standing in the open doorway to the pharmacy, atop the stoop, is John Pemberton in April 1888 at 47 Peachtree Street, Atlanta.

Pemberton blended the base syrup with carbonated water by accident when trying to make another glassful of the beverage. Pemberton decided then to sell this as a fountain drink rather than a medicine. Frank Mason Robinson came up with the name "Coca-Cola" for the alliterative sound, which was popular among other wine medicines of the time. Although the name refers to the two main ingredients, because of controversy over its cocaine content, the Coca-Cola Company later said that the name was "meaningless but fanciful". Robinson handwrote the Spencerian script on the bottles and ads. Pemberton made many health claims for his product, touting it as a "valuable brain tonic" that would cure headaches, relieve exhaustion, and calm nerves, and marketed it as "delicious, refreshing, pure joy, exhilarating", and "invigorating".

== Sale of Coca-Cola ==
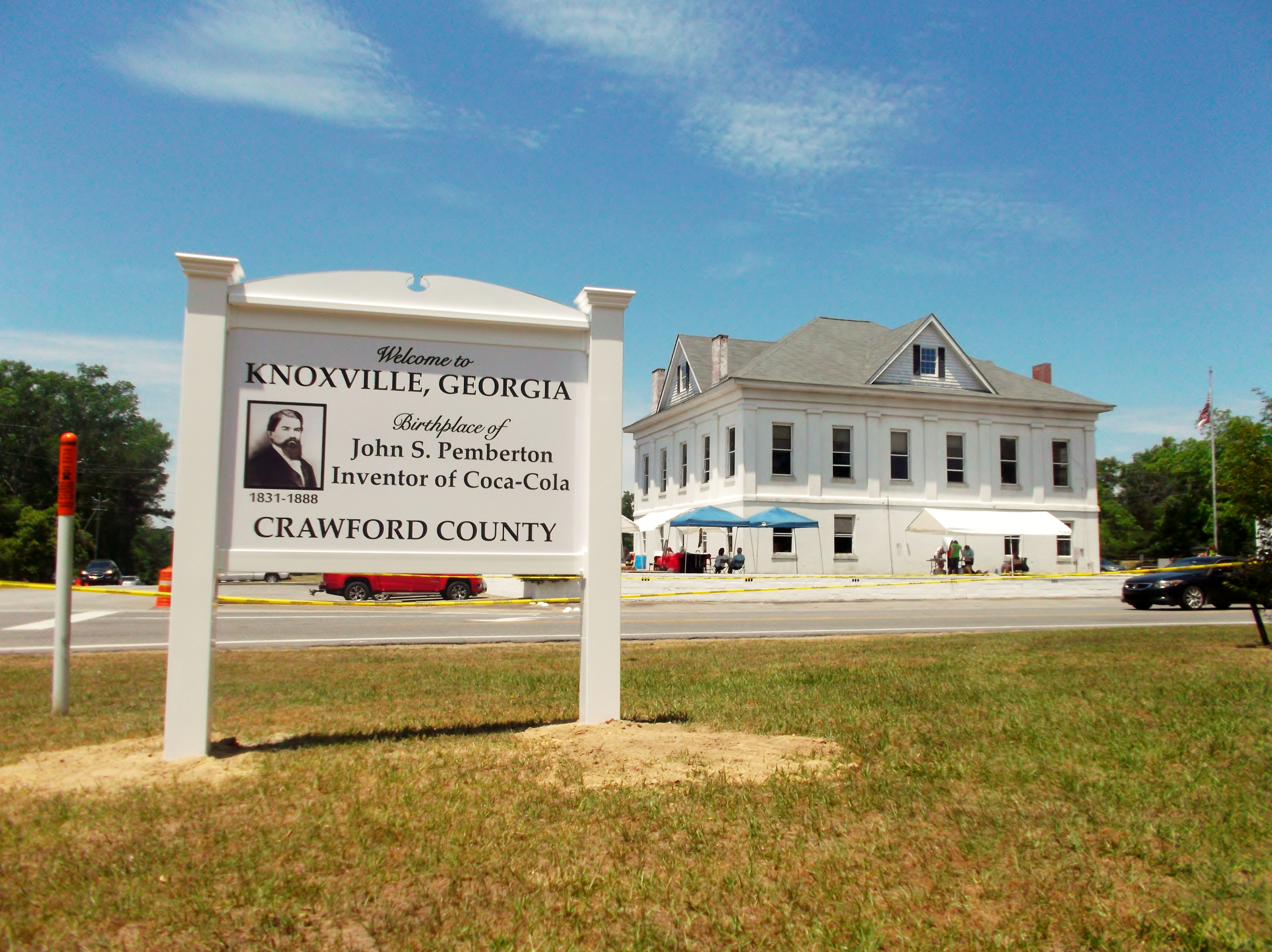
A sign in Knoxville, Georgia, commemorating John Pemberton

Soon after Coca-Cola was launched, Pemberton fell ill and was nearly bankrupt. Sick and desperate, he began selling rights to his formula to his business partners in Atlanta. Part of his motivation to sell was that he still suffered from his expensive ongoing morphine addiction. Pemberton had a hunch that his formula "someday will be a national drink," so he attempted to retain a share of the ownership to leave to his son. However, Pemberton's son wanted the money, so in 1888, Pemberton and his son sold the remaining portion of the patent to a fellow Atlanta pharmacist, Asa Griggs Candler, for $300 (USD), which in 2026 purchasing power is equal to $10,545.85 (USD).

== Death ==
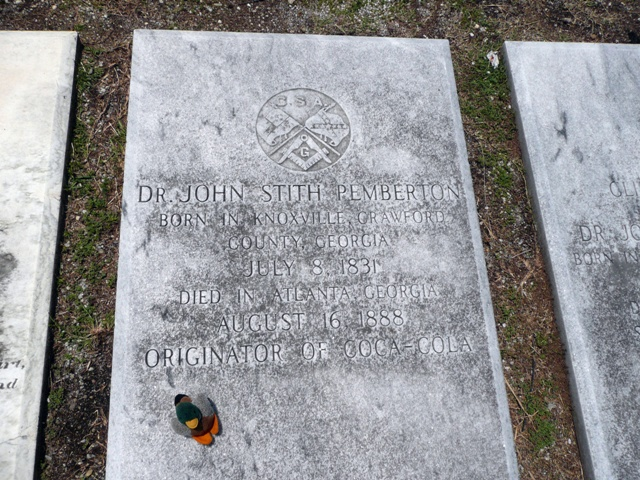
The grave of John Pemberton in Columbus, Georgia

Pemberton died from stomach cancer at the age of 57 on 16 August 1888. At the time of his death, he was poor and had become increasingly addicted to morphine. His body was returned to Columbus, Georgia, where he was buried at Linwood Cemetery. His grave marker is engraved with symbols showing his service in the Confederate Army and his membership as a Freemason. His son Charles continued to sell his father's formula, but six years later Charles Pemberton himself died, having succumbed to opium addiction.
