= Paolo Samorì =

Italian physical chemist (born 1971)

- Education: University of Bologna, Humboldt-Universität zu Berlin (PhD)
- Scientific career
- Workplaces: University of Strasbourg
- Thesis: Self-assembly of conjugated (macro)molecules nanostructures for molecular electronics (2000)
- Doctoral advisor: Jürgen P. Rabe

Paolo Samorì (born in Imola, Italy, 3 May 1971) is an Italian physical chemist and Distinguished Professor (PRCE) at the Institut de Science et d'Ingénierie Supramoléculaires (ISIS) of the Université de Strasbourg (UNISTRA) & CNRS where he heads the Nanochemistry Laboratory. He has been the ISIS director from 2012 to 2023, and was nominated director of ISIS again in September 2025.

== Education ==
Samorì obtained a Laurea (master's degree) in Industrial Chemistry at the University of Bologna in 1995. In 2000 he received his PhD in Chemistry from the Humboldt-Universität zu Berlin under the supervision of Jürgen P. Rabe. Samorì was a permanent research scientist at Istituto per la Sintesi Organica e la Fotoreattività of the Consiglio Nazionale delle Ricerche of Bologna from 2001 till 2008, and visiting professor at ISIS from 2003 til 2008.

== Career and research ==
He has published over 550 papers on applications of nanochemistry and materials science with a particular focus on graphene and related 2D materials, supramolecular electronics, scanning probe microscopies beyond imaging, hierarchical self-assembly of hybrid functional architectures at surfaces and interfaces, and the fabrication of organic- and graphene-based nanodevices for (opto-)electronics, chemical and physical sensing as well as energy storage. These papers have been cited over 40,000 times, leading to a h-index of 104.

He is using the supramolecular chemistry approach in order to generate ordered 1D, 2D and 3D architectures at surfaces and interfaces, aiming at controlling an improving the properties of opto-electronic and sensing devices.

He exploited supramolecular scaffolds based on H-bonding and metal-ligand interactions to control the patterning of functional groups in two dimensions. He fabricated the first dynamic operating at the solid-liquid interface which was monitored on the sub-molecular scale by means of scanning tunneling microscopy.

At the University of Strasbourg he showed that combining organic semiconductors with photochromic systems it is possible to fabricate optically switchable field-effect transistor as a first step towards multifunctional devices. Such research enabled him to fabricate both flexible non-volatile optical memory thin-film transistor devices with over 256 distinct levels based on an organic bicomponent blend, and optically switchable organic light-emitting transistors capable of emitting light in the range of the three primary RGB colors with the special feature of being capable of developing writable and erasable spatially defined patterns He is exploiting supramolecular methods to generate graphene based materials with tunable properties. For example, he was able to impart a light-responsive nature to 2D materials like graphene and MoS2 by combining them with stimuli-responsive molecules (like photochromic systems or electrochemical switches), even by means of the asymmetric functionalization of the two surfaces of the 2D materials, to realize multi-responsive and high-performance hybrid optoelectronic devices by mastering a more than Moore strategy. His current research is focused on the architecture vs function relationship in supramolecular and graphene-based materials for applications in (opto)electronics, chemical and physical sensing, energy storage and materials science, thereby addressing global challenges.

His present research interests are centered around internet of functions in ad hoc 0D to 3D functionalized multicomponent nanostructures and networks thereof for energy, sensing and optoelectronic applications.

- Chemistry of two-dimensional materials (graphene and other layered compounds): production, tuning of their properties, fabrication of devices.
- Multiscale tailoring of smart supramolecular systems: development of multiresponsive coatings and composites.
- High-performance multifunctional materials and (nano)devices for opto-electronics, chemical and physical sensing, data storage, energy generation and storage, etc.

In 2022 the Presidency of the Council of Ministers of Italy has appointed him Ufficiale Ordine al Merito della Repubblica Italiana. He is Fellow of the Royal Society of Chemistry (FRSC), fellow of the European Academy of Sciences (EURASC), member of the Academia Europaea (MAE), member of the European Academy of Sciences and Arts, foreign member of the Royal Flemish Academy of Belgium for Science and the Arts (KVAB), fellow of the Accademia di Ingegneria e Tecnologia (National Academy of Engineering and Technology of Italy – ITATEC), member of the Académie des Technologies (French Academy of Technologies), member of the German National Academy of Science and Engineering acatech, and senior member of the Institut Universitaire de France (IUF).

== Awards ==
- Young scientist award - European Materials Research Society (1998 & 2000)
- IUPAC Prize for Young Chemists 2001
- "Vincenzo Caglioti" award 2006 granted by the Accademia Nazionale dei Lincei
- "Nicolò Copernico" award 2009 (Italy) for his discoveries in the field of nanoscience and nanotechnology
- "Guy Ourisson" award 2010 of the Cercle Gutenberg (France)
- Junior member of the Institut Universitaire de France (IUF) 2010
- European Research Council – Starting Grant 2010
- Royal Society of Chemistry - Fellow (FRSC) 2011
- CNRS Silver Medal 2012.
- Elected member of the Academia Europaea (MAE) 2014
- Elected fellow of the European Academy of Sciences 2014
- Honorary Member of the University of Nova Gorica, Slovenia 2017
- European Research Council – Proof-of-Concept 2017
- Catalan-Sabatier-Award (Spanish Royal Society of Chemistry) 2017
- Grignard Wittig Lecture (German Chemical Society) 2017
- Royal Society of Chemistry - Surfaces and Interfaces Award 2018
- Blaise Pascal Medal in Materials Science (EURASC)
- Advisory Professor Shanghai Jiao Tong University, China 2018
- Grand Prix Pierre Süe Société Chimique de France 2018
- Elected foreign member of the Royal Flemish Academy of Belgium for Science and the Arts (KVAB) 2019
- European Research Council Advanced Grant 2019
- "Les Étoiles de l’Europe" award - French Ministry of Higher Education, Research and Innovation
- European Research Council Proof-of-Concept 2020
- Fellow of the Institute of Advanced Studies (USIAS), Université de Strasbourg (UNISTRA) 2020
- senior member of the Institut Universitaire de France (IUF) 2020
- Royal Society of Chemistry - Société Chimique de France Lectureship in Chemical Sciences 2020
- Fellow of the Materials Research Society (MRS) 2021
- Distinguished Fellow of International Engineering and Technology Institute (IETI) 2022
- Elected member of the European Academy of Sciences and Arts 2022
- Prix André Collet, Groupe de Chimie Supramoléculaire Société Chimique de France 2022
- Master Distinguished Lecture @ Shanghai Jiao Tong University, Shanghai, China 2023
- Elected member of the Académie des Technologies (French Academy of Technologies) 2023
- Elected member of the German National Academy of Science and Engineering acatech 2024
- Mid-Career Researcher Award – IUMRS-ICEM 2024
- "Prof. Luigi Tartufari" Award – Accademia Nazionale dei Lincei 2024
- Senior member of the Institut Universitaire de France (IUF) 2025
- Amedeo Avogadro Medal – Accademia Nazionale delle Scienze detta dei XL, Consiglio Nazionale delle Ricerche, Società chimica italiana 2025
- European Colloid and Interface Society (ECIS) - Syensqo Award 2026
- Bilateral France-China Prize of the Chinese Chemical Society (Beijing) (CCS) and Société Chimique de France (SCF) 2026

== Associate editor ==
- ACS Nano (American Chemical Society), 2023–present
- Nanoscale (Royal Society of Chemistry), 2018–2022
- Nanoscale Advances (Royal Society of Chemistry), 2019–2022

== Member to the advisory boards ==
- Advanced Materials (Wiley-VCH), 2006–present
- Journal of Materials Chemistry (Royal Society of Chemistry), 2008–present
- Nanoscale (Royal Society of Chemistry), 2009–present
- Small (Wiley-VCH), 2012–present
- ChemPhysChem (Wiley-VCH), 2011–present
- Chemical Communications (Royal Society of Chemistry), 2012–present
- Chemical Society Reviews (Royal Society of Chemistry), 2013–present
- ACS Omega (American Chemical Society), 2016–present
- ACS Nano (American Chemical Society), 2017–2022
- ChemNanoMat (Wiley-VCH), 2018–present
- ChemSystemsChem (Wiley-VCH), 2018–present
- Nanoscale Horizons (Royal Society of Chemistry), 2019–present
- SmartMat (Wiley-VCH), 2020–present
- Advanced Sensor Research (Wiley-VCH), 2022–present
- Science Bulletin and Chinese Science Bulletin, 2023–present
- Chemistry Europe (Wiley-VCH), 2023–present
- Responsive Materials (Wiley-VCH), 2023–present
- RSC Applied Interfaces (RSC), 2023–present
