= Vincenzo Balzani =

Italian chemist (born 1936)

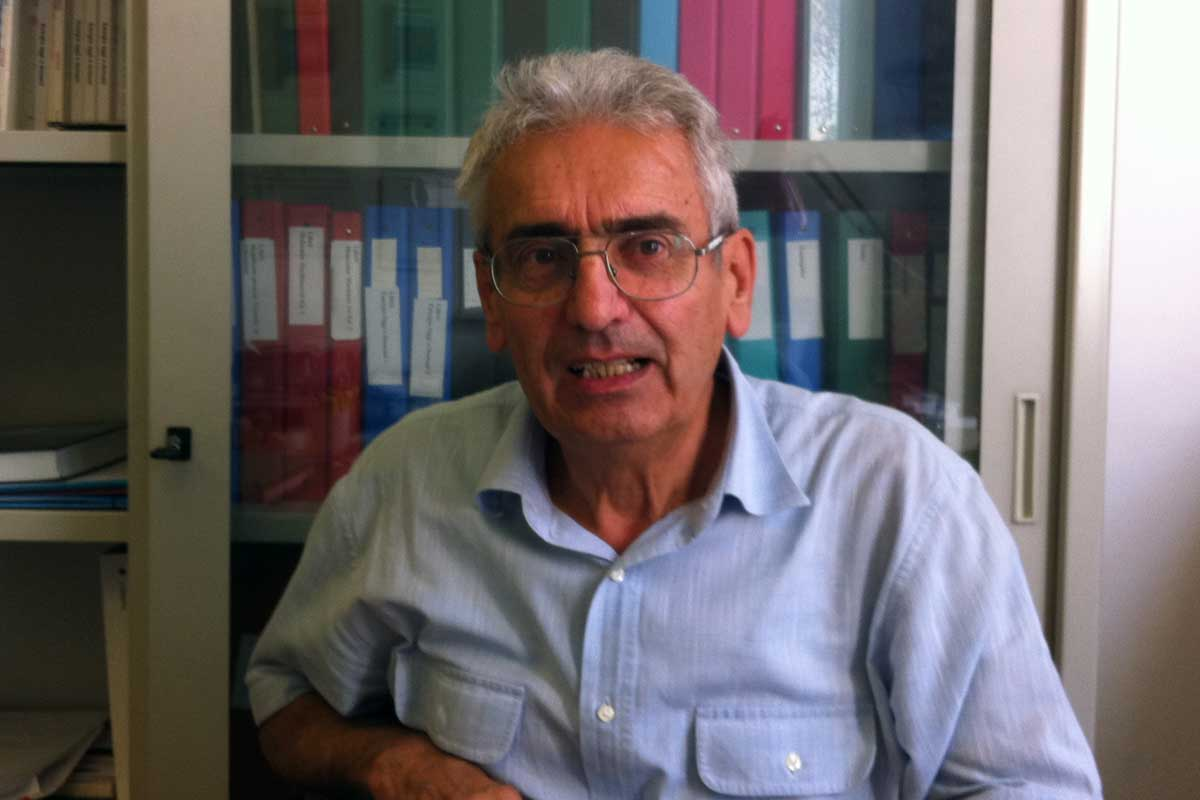
- Born: 15 November 1936 (age 89); Forlimpopoli, Italy
- Education: University of Bologna
- Scientific career
- Fields: Photochemistry
- Workplaces: University of Bologna

Vincenzo Balzani (born 15 November 1936 in Forlimpopoli, Italy) is an Italian chemist, now emeritus professor at the University of Bologna.

== Career ==
He has spent most of his professional life at the "Giacomo Ciamician" Department of Chemistry of the University of Bologna, becoming full professor in 1973. He has been appointed emeritus professor on November 1, 2010.

== Teaching activity ==
He taught courses on General and Inorganic Chemistry, Photochemistry, Supramolecular chemistry. He was chairman of the PhD course on Chemical Sciences from 2002 to 2007 and of the "laurea specialistica" in Photochemistry and Material Chemistry from 2004 to 2007. In the Academic Year 2008–2009, he founded at the University of Bologna an interdisciplinary course on Science and Society.

== Scientific activity ==
He has carried out an intense scientific activity in the fields of photochemistry, photophysics, electron transfer reactions, supramolecular chemistry, nanotechnology, machines and devices at the molecular level, photochemical conversion of solar energy. With its 650 publications cited more than 64,000 times in the scientific literature (H index 119), he is one of the best known chemists in the world. He is author or co-author of texts for researchers in English, some translated into Chinese and Japanese, which are currently adopted in universities in many countries. A few of the most significant texts are: Photochemistry of Coordination Compounds (1970), Supramolecular Photochemistry (1991), Molecular Devices and Machines - Concepts and Perspectives for the Nanoworld (2008), Energy for a Sustainable World (2011), Photochemistry and Photophysics: Concepts, Research, Applications (2014).

== Public education activity ==
For many years, alongside scientific research, he has carried out an intense dissemination activity, also on the relationship between science and society and between science and peace, with particular reference to energy and resource issues. He is convinced that scientists have a great responsibility that derives from their knowledge and therefore it is their duty to actively contribute to solving the problems of humanity, particularly those connected to the current energy-climate crisis. Every year he holds dozens of seminars in primary or secondary schools and public conferences to illustrate to students and citizens the problems created by the use of fossil fuels: climate change, ecological unsustainability and the social unease deriving from growing inequalities. He believes that three transitions are necessary: from fossil fuels to renewable energies, from the linear economy to the circular economy and from consumerism to sobriety. On these themes he is coauthor of books much appreciated by students and teachers of secondary schools: Chimica (2000); Energia oggi e domani: Prospettive, sfide, speranze (2004); Energia per l'astronave Terra (2017), whose first edition (2007) won the Galileo award for scientific dissemination; Chimica! Leggere e scrivere il libro della natura (2012), English version: Chemistry! Reading and writing the book of Nature (2014); Energia, risorse, ambiente (2014); Le macchine molecolari (2018), finalist in the National Award for Scientific Dissemination Giancarlo Dosi.

== Other activities ==
Visiting professor: University of British Columbia, Vancouver, Canada 1972; Energy Research Center, Hebrew University of Jerusalem, Israel, 1979; University of Strasbourg, France, 1990; University of Leuven, Belgium, 1991; University of Bordeaux, France, 1994. Chairman: Gruppo Italiano di Fotochimica (1982–1986), European Photochemistry Association (1988–92); XII IUPAC Symposium on Photochemistry (1988); International Symposium on "Photochemistry and Photophysics of Coordination Compounds (since 1989, now Honorary Chairman); PhD course in Chemistry Sciences (2002–2007) e Laurea specialistica in Photochemistry and Chemistry of Materials (2004–2007), University of Bologna.

Director: Institute of Photochemistry and High Energy Radiations (FRAE), National Research Council (Italy), Bologna (1977–1988) and Center for the Photochemical Conversion of Solar Energy, University of Bologna (1981–1998). Member of the Scientific Committee of several international scientific journals. Member of the Scientific Committee of the Urban Plan for Sustainable Mobility (PUMS), of the Bologna metropolitan area (2008–).

Political activity: In 2009 he started the Science and Society interdisciplinary course at the University of Bologna with the aim of bridging the gap between University and City; it has long been hoping for the strengthening of similar initiatives for the cultural growth of the Metropolitan City. In 2014 he founded the Energia per l'Italia group,[2] formed by 22 professors and researchers of the university and of the most important research centers of Bologna, with the aim of offering the Government and local politicians guidelines to tackle the energy problem according to a broad perspective that includes scientific, social, environmental and cultural aspects.

Coordinator and editor: Supramolecular Photochemistry, NATO ASI Series n. 214, Reidel, Dordrecht (1987); Supramolecular Chemistry, NATO ASI Series n. 371, Reidel, Dordrecht (1992) (with L. De Cola); Guest Editor, Supramolecular Photochemistry, New J. Chem., N.7–8, vol. 20 (1996); Editor in chief of the Handbook on Electron Transfer in Chemistry, in five volumes, Wiley-VCH, Weinheim (2001); Topics in Current Chemistry, volumes 280 and 281 on Photochemistry and Photophysics of Coordination Compounds (2007).

== Associations and academies ==
He is a member of: Società Chimica Italiana; Accademia delle Scienze di Bologna; Accademia delle Scienze di Torino; Società Nazionale di Scienze, Lettere ed Arti in Napoli; Accademia Nazionale delle Scienze detta dei XL; Accademia Nazionale dei Lincei; European Photochemistry Association; ChemPubSoc Europe; Academia Europaea; European Academy of Sciences, European Academy of Sciences and Arts; American Association for the Advancement of Science.

== Honors and awards ==
Pacific West Coast Inorganic Lectureship, USA and Canada, 1985; Gold Medal "S. Cannizzaro", Italian Chemical Society, 1988; Doctorate "Honoris Causa", University of Fribourg (CH), 1989; Accademia dei Lincei Award in Chemistry, Italy, 1992; Ziegler-Natta Lecturer, Gesellschaft Deutscher Chemiker, Germany, 1994; Italgas European Prize for Research and Innovation, 1994; Centenary Lecturer, The Royal Chemical Society (U.K.), 1995; Porter Medal for Photochemistry, 2000; Prix Franco-Italien de la Société Française de Chimie, 2002; Grande Ufficiale dell’Ordine al Merito della Repubblica Italiana, 2006; Quilico Gold Metal, Organic Division, Italian Chemical Society, 2008; Honor Professor, East China University of Science and Technology of Shanghai, 2009; Blaise Pascal Medal, European Academy of Sciences, 2009; Rotary Club Galileo International Prize for scientific research, 2011; Nature Award for Mentoring in Science, 2013; Archiginnasio d’oro, Città di Bologna, 2016; Grand Prix de la Maison de la Chimie (France) 2016; Leonardo da Vinci Award, European Academy of Sciences, 2017; Nicholas J. Turro Award, Inter-American Photochemical Society, 2018; Cavaliere di Gran Croce della Repubblica Italiana per meriti scientifici, 2019; Primo Levi Award, Gesellschaft Deutscher Chemiker and Società Chimica Italiana, 2019; UNESCO-Russia Mendeleev Prize, 2021.

== Publications ==
=== Scientific books ===
- V. Balzani; V. Carassiti (1970). Photochemistry of Coordination Compounds. London: Academic Press.
- V. Balzani; F. Scandola (1991). Supramolecular Photochemistry. Chichester: Horwood.
- V. Balzani; M. Venturi; A. Credi (2003). Molecular Devices and Machines. A Journey into the Nano World. Weinheim: Wiley-VCH. ISBN 978-3-527-30506-3. Translated into Chinese and Japanese.
- V. Balzani; A. Credi; M. Venturi (2008). Molecular Devices and Machines. Concepts and Perspectives for the Nanoworld. Weinheim: Wiley-VCH. ISBN 978-3-527-31800-1. Translated into Chinese.
- N. Armaroli; V. Balzani (2011). Energy for a Sustainable World – From the Oil Age to a Sun-Powered Future. Weinheim: Wiley-VCH. ISBN 978-3-527-32540-5. Translated into Chinese.
- N. Armaroli; V. Balzani; N. Serpone (2013). Powering Planet Earth – Energy Solutions for the Future. Wiley-VCH. ISBN 978-3-527-33409-4.
- V. Balzani; P. Ceroni; A. Juris (2014). Photochemistry and Photophysics - Concepts, Research, Applications. Weinheim: Wiley-VCH. ISBN 978-3-527-33479-7. Translated into Chinese
- V. Balzani; M. Venturi (2014). Chemistry: Reading and Writing the Book of Nature. Cambridge: Royal Society of Chemistry. ISBN 978-1-78262-002-0.

=== Educational books (in Italian) ===
- V. Balzani; M. Venturi (2000). Chimica. La Scuola. ISBN 978-8-835-09740-2.
- N. Armaroli; V. Balzani (2004). Energia oggi e domani: Prospettive, sfide, speranze. Bologna: Bononia University Press. ISBN 978-8-873-95093-6.
- N. Armaroli; V. Balzani (2008). Energia per l'astronave Terra. Zanichelli. ISBN 978-8-808-06391-5.
- V. Balzani; M. Venturi (2012). Chimica! Leggere e scrivere il libro della natura. Scientia Express. ISBN 978-8-896-97342-4.
- V. Balzani; M. Venturi (2014). Energia, risorse, ambiente. Zanichelli. ISBN 978-8-808-16296-0.
- A. Credi; V. Balzani (2018). Le macchine molecolari. 1088 Press. ISBN 978-8-831-92600-3.

=== Some important papers in scientific journals ===
- A. Juris; V. Balzani; F. Barigelletti; S. Campagna; et al. (1988). "Ru(II) polypyridine complexes: photophysics, photochemistry, electrochemistry, and chemiluminescence". Coordination Chemistry Reviews. 84: 85–277. doi:10.1016/0010-8545(88)80032-8.
- V. Balzani (1990). "Supramolecular photochemistry". Pure and Applied Chemistry. 62 (6): 1099–1102. doi:10.1351/pac199062061099. S2CID 4039047.
- P. L. Anelli; P. R. Ashton; R. Ballardini; V. Balzani; et al. (1992). "Molecular meccano. 1. [2]Rotaxanes and a [2]catenane made to order". Journal of the American Chemical Society. 114 (1): 193–218. Bibcode:1992JAChS.114..193A. doi:10.1021/ja00027a027.
- J.-P. Sauvage; V. Balzani; et al. (1994). "Ruthenium(II) and Osmium(II) Bis(terpyridine) Complexes in Covalently-Linked Multicomponent Systems: Synthesis, Electrochemical Behavior, Absorption Spectra, and Photochemical and Photophysical Properties". Chemical Reviews. 94 (4): 993–1019. doi:10.1021/cr00028a006.
- V. Balzani; A. Juris; M. Venturi; S. Campagna; S. Serroni (1996). "Luminescent and Redox-Active Polynuclear Transition Metal Complexes". Chemical Reviews. 96 (2): 759–834. doi:10.1021/cr941154y. PMID 11848772.
- V. Balzani; S. Campagna; G. Denti; A. Juris; et al. (1998). "Designing Dendrimers Based on Transition-Metal Complexes. Light-Harvesting Properties and Predetermined Redox Patterns". Accounts of Chemical Research. 31 (1): 26–34. doi:10.1021/ar950202d.
- V. Balzani; M. Gomez-Lopez; J. F. Stoddart (1998). "Molecular Machines". Accounts of Chemical Research. 31 (7): 405–414. doi:10.1021/ar970340y.
- V. Balzani; A. Credi; F. M. Raymo; J. F. Stoddart (2000). "Artificial Molecular Machines". Angewandte Chemie. 39 (19): 3348–3391. Bibcode:2000AngCh..39.3348B. doi:10.1002/1521-3773(20001002)39:19<3348::AID-ANIE3348>3.0.CO;2-X. PMID 11091368.
- J. D. Badjić; V. Balzani; A. Credi; S. Silvi; J. F. Stoddart (2004). "A Molecular Elevator". Science. 303 (5665): 1845–1849. Bibcode:2004Sci...303.1845B. doi:10.1126/science.1094791. PMID 15031499. S2CID 21272628.
- N. Armaroli; V. Balzani (2007). "The Future of Energy Supply: Challenges and Opportunities". Angewandte Chemie. 46 (1–2): 52–66. Bibcode:2007ACIE...46...52A. doi:10.1002/anie.200602373. PMID 17103469.
- V. Balzani; A. Credi; M. Venturi (2008). "Photochemical Conversion of Solar Energy". ChemSusChem. 1 (1–2): 26–58. Bibcode:2008ChSCh...1...26B. doi:10.1002/cssc.200700087. PMID 18605661.
- N. Armaroli; V. Balzani (2011). "The Hydrogen Issue". ChemSusChem. 4 (1–2): 21–36. Bibcode:2011ChSCh...4...21A. doi:10.1002/cssc.201000182. PMID 21226208.
- N. Armaroli; V. Balzani (2011). "Towards an electricity-powered world". Energy and Environmental Science. 4 (9): 3193–3222. Bibcode:2011EnEnS...4.3193A. doi:10.1039/c1ee01249e. S2CID 1752800.
- N. Armaroli; V. Balzani (2015). "Solar Electricity and Solar Fuels: Status and Perspectives in the Context of the Energy Transition". Chemistry - A European Journal. 22 (1): 32–57. doi:10.1002/chem.201503580. PMID 26584653.
- V. Balzani; G. Bergamini; P. Ceroni (2017). "Photochemistry and Photocatalysis". Rendiconti Lincei. 28 (1): 125–142. doi:10.1007/s12210-016-0575-x. S2CID 99537412.
- V. Balzani; G. Pacchioni; M. Prato; A. Zecchin (2019). "Solar-driven chemistry: towards new catalytic solutions for a sustainable world". Rendiconti Lincei. 30 (3): 443–452. doi:10.1007/s12210-019-00836-2. hdl:10281/260088.
