= German Chemical Society =

German professional society of chemists

Gesellschaft Deutscher Chemiker
- Formation: 1949 (1867)
- Type: Learned society
- Headquarters: Frankfurt
- Location: Germany
- Members: 30,000
- Official language: German
- President: Prof. Dr. Peter R. Schreiner
- Website: www.gdch.de

The German Chemical Society (German: Gesellschaft Deutscher Chemiker, GDCh) is a learned society and professional association founded in 1949 to represent the interests of German chemists in local, national and international contexts. GDCh "brings together people working in chemistry and the molecular sciences and supports their striving for positive, sustainable scientific advance – for the good of humankind and the environment, and a future worth living for."

== History ==
The earliest precursor of today's GDCh was the German Chemical Society (Deutsche Chemische Gesellschaft zu Berlin, DChG). Adolf von Baeyer was prominent among the German chemists who established DChG in 1867; and August Wilhelm von Hofmann was the first president. This society was modeled after the British Chemical Society, which was the precursor of the Royal Society of Chemistry. Like its British counterpart, DChG sought to foster the communication of new ideas and facts throughout Germany and across international borders.

In 1946, the current organization was created by a merger of the German Chemical Society (DChG) and the Association of German Chemists (Verein Deutscher Chemiker, VDCh).

Honorary Members of the GDCh have included Otto Hahn, Robert B. Woodward, Jean-Marie Lehn, George Olah and other eminent scientists.

== Activities ==
Scientific publications of the society include Nachrichten aus der Chemie, Angewandte Chemie, Chemistry: A European Journal, European Journal of Inorganic Chemistry, European Journal of Organic Chemistry, ChemPhysChem, ChemSusChem, ChemBioChem, ChemMedChem, ChemCatChem, ChemistryViews, Chemie Ingenieur Technik and Chemie in unserer Zeit.

In the 21st century, the society has become a member of ChemPubSoc Europe, which is an organization of 16 European chemical societies. This European consortium was established in the late 1990s as many chemical journals owned by national chemical societies were amalgamated.

=== Prizes and awards ===
The society acknowledges individual achievement with prizes and awards, including medals originally conferred by the predecessor organizations DChG and VDCh:

- Hofmann Medal (Hofmann Denkmünze), first awarded to Henri Moissan, 1903
- Liebig Medal (Liebig Denkmünze), first awarded to Adolf von Baeyer, 1903
- Gmelin-Beilstein Medal (Gmelin-Beilstein Denkmünze), first awarded to Paul Walden and Maximilian Pflücke, 1954
- Hermann Staudinger Prize (Hermann-Staudinger-Preis), first awarded to Werner Kern and Günter Victor Schulz in 1971.
- Meyer-Galow Award For Business Chemistry (Der Meyer-Galow-Preis für Wirtschaftschemie), first awarded to Susanne Röhrig, 2012 .

== See also ==
- List of chemistry societies
- Royal Society of Chemistry, 1841
- Société Chimique de France, 1857
- American Chemical Society, 1876
- Chemical Society of Japan, 1878
