= Nicola Armaroli =

Italian chemist, research director (born 1966)

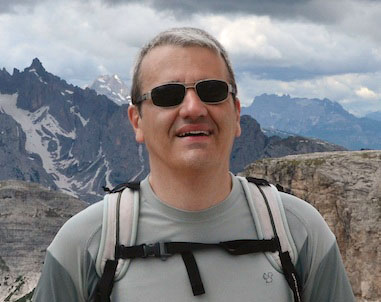
- Born: 2 September 1966 (age 59); Bentivoglio, Emilia-Romagna, Italy
- Education: University of Bologna
- Scientific career
- Fields: Photochemistry, photophysics
- Workplaces: Italian National Research Council

Nicola Armaroli (Bentivoglio, 2 September 1966) is an Italian chemist, research director at the Italian National Research Council (CNR), director of the scientific magazine Sapere and member of the Italian National Academy of Sciences.

== Life and research activity ==
He graduated in Chemistry at the University of Bologna in 1990, where he obtained his PhD in 1994. He has worked since 1997 at the Institute for Organic Synthesis and Photoreactivity (ISOF) of the Italian National Research Council (CNR). Since 2014 he has served as director of Sapere, the first Italian science magazine, established in 1935. From 2019 he has been member of the Italian National Academy of Sciences. He is a member of the Executive Board of the European Chemical Society (EuChemS) and Fellow of the Royal Society of Chemistry (FRSC). He chaired the Chemistry and Energy Working Party of the European Chemical Society (2011-2017). He is a member of the editorial board of Chemistry: A European Journal (Wiley-VCH), Photochemical & Photobiological Sciences (RSC), Polyhedron (Elsevier). In 2001 he won the International Grammaticakis-Neumann Prize for photochemistry, in 2009 the Galileo Prize for Scientific Dissemination, in 2017 the Enzo Tiezzi Gold Medal of the Italian Chemical Society and in 2019 the Ravani-Pellati Chemistry Award of the Turin Academy of Sciences. His research activity concerns the photochemistry and photophysics of coordination compounds, carbon nanostructures and supramolecular systems and materials. This research is of interest for fundamental knowledge and for technological applications such as the conversion of solar energy, new materials for lighting, catalysis and remote sensing. He actively promotes science dissemination on the topics of energy technologies, natural resources and the environment, on the media and in society.

== Publications ==
=== Books ===
- With Vincenzo Balzani: Energia oggi e domani. Prospettive, sfide, speranze, Bononia University Press, 2004, ISBN 88-7395-093-0.
- With Vincenzo Balzani: Energia per l’Astronave Terra- Quanta ne usiamo, come la produciamo, che cosa ci riserva il futuro, Zanichelli 2008, ISBN 978-88-08-06391-5.
- With Vincenzo Balzani: Energy for a Sustainable World – From the Oil Age to a Sun-Powered Future, Wiley-VCH 2011, ISBN 978-3-527-32540-5.
- With Vincenzo Balzani and Nick Serpone: Powering Planet Earth – Energy Solutions for the Future, Wiley-VCH 2013, ISBN 978-3-527-33409-4.

=== Selected Papers in scientific journals ===
- Nicola Armaroli, Vincenzo Balzani: Solar Electricity and Solar Fuels: Status and Perspectives in the Context of the Energy Transition. In: Chemistry – A European Journal (2016), doi:10.1002/chem.201503580.
- Praveen et al.: Oligo(phenylenevinylene) hybrids and self-assemblies: versatile materials for excitation energy transfer. In: Chemical Society Reviews 43, Issue 12, (2014), 4222–4242, doi:10.1039/C3CS60406C.
- Costa et al., Luminescent Ionic Transition-Metal Complexes for Light-Emitting Electrochemical Cells. In: Angewandte Chemie International Edition 51, Issue 33, (2012), 8178–8211, doi:10.1002/anie.201201471.
- Nicola Armaroli, Vincenzo Balzani, The Hydrogen Issue. In: ChemSusChem 4, Issue 1, (2011), 21–36, doi:10.1002/cssc.201000182.
- Nicola Armaroli, Vincenzo Balzani, Towards an electricity-powered world. In: Energy and Environmental Science 4, (2011), 3193–3222, doi:10.1039/c1ee01249e.
- Nicola Armaroli, Vincenzo Balzani, The Future of Energy Supply: Challenges and Opportunities. In: Angewandte Chemie International Edition 46, (2007), 52–66, doi:10.1002/anie.200602373.
- Nicola Armaroli et al., Photochemistry and Photophysics of Coordination Compounds: Copper. In: Photochemistry and Photophysics of Coordination Compounds 280, (2007), 69-115, doi:10.1007/128_2007_128.
- Nicola Armaroli, Photoactive mono- and polynuclear Cu(I)–phenanthrolines. A viable alternative to Ru(II)–polypyridines?. In: Chemical Society Reviews 30, (2001), 113–124, doi:10.1039/B000703J.
- Jean-François Eckert et al., Fullerene−Oligophenylenevinylene Hybrids: Synthesis, Electronic Properties, and Incorporation in Photovoltaic Devices. In: Journal of the American Chemical Society 122, Issue 31, (2000), 7467–7479, doi:10.1021/ja9941072.
- Nicola Armaroli et al., Charge‐Transfer Interactions in Face‐to‐Face Porphyrin‐Fullerene Systems: Solvent‐Dependent Luminescence in the Infrared Spectral Region. In: Chemistry – A European Journal 6, Issue 9, (2000), 1629–1645, doi:10.1002/(SICI)1521-3765(20000502)6:9<1629::AID-CHEM1629>3.0.CO;2-Z.
- Nicola Armaroli et al., Rotaxanes Incorporating Two Different Coordinating Units in Their Thread: Synthesis and Electrochemically and Photochemically Induced Molecular Motions. In: Journal of the American Chemical Society 121, Issue 18, (1999), 4397–4408, doi:10.1021/ja984051w.
