= Liane Marcia Rossi =

Brazilian chemist

- Education: Federal University of Santa Catarina; Federal University of Rio Grande do Sul
- Scientific career
- Workplaces: University of New Orleans; University of São Paulo
- Thesis: Novos complexos binucleares de cobre de relevância bioinorgânica (2001)
- Website: Laboratory of Nanomaterials and Catalysis

Liane M. Rossi is a Brazilian chemist who is a Professor of Inorganic Chemistry at the University of São Paulo. Her research considers nanomaterials and catalysis. She serves on the editorial boards of ChemistrySelect, ACS Catalysis and ACS Sustainable Chemistry & Engineering.

== Education ==
Rossi earned her undergraduate degree in chemical engineering at the Federal University of Rio Grande do Sul. She moved to the Federal University of Santa Catarina for her graduate research. She returned to the Federal University of Rio Grande do Sul, where she spent two years as a postdoc, before moving to the University of New Orleans.

== Research and career ==
In 2004, Rossi returned to Brazil, joining the Institute of Chemistry at the University of São Paulo. She was promoted to full Professor in 2016. Her research considers catalysis, green chemistry and the development of nanomaterials. She was particularly interested in hydrogenation, oxidation and the conversion of biomass into useful chemicals.

Rossi is particularly interested in carbon dioxide conversion, and she coordinates the São Paulo Research Foundation–Shell programme, Innovative process for CO_{2} conversion to high added value chemicals and fuels based on hybrid catalysts. Rossi has explored the creation of metallic nanoparticles for heterogeneous catalysis.

Rossi serves on the Editorial Boards of ChemistrySelect, ACS Catalysis and ACS Sustainable Chemistry & Engineering. She documented the challenges in leading a laboratory and teaching students in Brazil during the COVID-19 pandemic. As internet access in Brazil is patchy, students struggled to attend online classes, and the high number of COVID-19 cases made returning to in-person research difficult.

== Selected publications ==
- Liane M. Rossi; Natalia J. S. Costa; Fernanda P. Silva; Wojcieszak, Robert (2014). "Magnetic nanomaterials in catalysis: advanced catalysts for magnetic separation and beyond". Green Chemistry. 16 (6): 2906. doi:10.1039/c4gc00164h. Wikidata Q63386092.
- Liane Marcia Rossi; Ashley D Quach; Zeev Rosenzweig (2004). "Glucose oxidase-magnetite nanoparticle bioconjugate for glucose sensing". Analytical and Bioanalytical Chemistry. 380 (4): 606–613. doi:10.1007/s00216-004-2770-3. PMID 15448967. Wikidata Q45078584.
- Liane Marcia Rossi; Lifang Shi; Frank H. Quina; Zeev Rosenzweig (2005). "Stöber synthesis of monodispersed luminescent silica nanoparticles for bioanalytical assays". Langmuir. 21 (10): 4277–4280. doi:10.1021/la0504098. PMID 16032835. Wikidata Q46609803.

== Personal life ==
Rossi is married to a chemist.
