= Advanced Functional Materials =

- Discipline: Materials Science
- Language: English
- Edited by: Joern Ritterbusch

Publication details
- Former names: Advanced Materials for Optics and Electronics 1992 - 2000, Chemtronics 1986 - 1991, Journal of Molecular Electronics 1985 - 1991
- History: 1985–present
- Publisher: Wiley-VCH (Germany)
- Frequency: weekly
- Open access: Hybrid
- Impact factor: 19.0 (2024)

Standard abbreviations
- ISO 4: Adv. Funct. Mater.

Indexing
- CODEN: AFMDC6
- ISSN: 1616-301X (print); 1616-3028 (web)
- LCCN: 2001205770

Links
- Journal homepage; AFM news service

Advanced Functional Materials is a peer-reviewed scientific journal, published by Wiley-VCH. Established in February 2001, the journal began to publish monthly in 2002 and moved to 18/year in 2006, biweekly in 2008, and weekly in 2013.

It has been published under other titles since 1985.

== Scope ==
Coverage of this journal encompasses all topics pertaining to materials science. Topical coverage includes photovoltaics, organic electronics, carbon materials, nanotechnology, liquid crystals, magnetic materials, surfaces and interfaces, and biomaterials. Publishing formats include original research papers, feature articles and highlights.

== History ==
It was established in 2001 by Peter Gregory, the Editor of Advanced Materials, when the Wiley journal Advanced Materials for Optics and Electronics (starting in 1992) was discontinued; the volume numbering continued, however.

Advanced Functional Materials is the sister journal to Advanced Materials and publishes full papers and feature articles on the development and applications of functional materials, including topics in chemistry, physics, nanotechnology, ceramics, metallurgy, and biomaterials. Frequent topics covered by the journal also include liquid crystals, semiconductors, superconductors, optics, lasers, sensors, porous materials, light-emitting materials, magnetic materials, thin films, and colloids.

The current editor-in-chief is Joern Ritterbusch; David Flanagan was previously the editor-in-chief.

== Abstracting and indexing ==
Advanced Functional Materials is indexed in the following bibliographic databases:

- Thomson Reuters Web of Science
- CSA Illunina
- Chemical Abstracts Service (ACS)
- Compendex
- FIZ Karlsruhe Databases
- INSPEC
- Polymer Library
- SCOPUS (Elsevier)

== See also ==
- Advanced Materials
- Advanced Engineering Materials
- Small
- Small Science
- Journal of Materials Chemistry
- Chemistry of Materials
- Nature Materials
