= Novel Therapeutic Targets for Antiarrhythmic Drugs =

Book about cardiac arrhythmia treatment

- Editor: George Billman
- Genre: Medicine
- Publisher: John Wiley and Sons
- Publication date: 2010

Novel Therapeutic Targets for Antiarrhythmic Drugs is a book edited by George Billman and published by John Wiley and Sons in 2010.

== Content ==
According to the publisher, the book describes the current state of cardiac arrhythmia treatment, and attempts to identify future directions research may take. Its 21 chapters cover a variety of topics related to cardiac arrhythmia and electrophysiology, primarily reviewing known molecular targets for drugs. Subjects covered in the book include both traditional approaches to looking at arrhythmia, such as ion channel effects, and more general issues such as the genetics behind differential response to existing drug therapies. Drug safety and side effects are also cover.

The book examines avenues by which new treatments might be developed, with four chapters (10, 13, 16, 17) specifically focused on novel targets. Novel ideas offered included studying sodium-calcium exchanger and ryanodine receptor effects. One chapter (5) is dedicated to examining the targets on which existing drugs operate, and another (8) examines drugs in clinical trial at the time of publication. The chemical structure of existing drugs is not covered. Overall, the book advocates for segregating drug targets by disease type and state, rather than the conventional approach of segregating by likelihood to harm. In addition to pharmacological therapies, the book examines potential alternate treatments to arrhythmia including the effect of endurance training on susceptibility. It also investigates omega-3 fatty acids which have a proven effect on cardiac electrophysiology, but have failed to prove protective when obtained through diet.

According to cardiologist Peter R. Kowey, the chapter authors are "eminent scientists" in their respective areas. The list includes "some brilliant industry scientists", but does not include any clinicians or drug trialists, possibly creating a biased perspective, according to Kowey.

== Response ==
In a review for Circulation, Kowey called the book "an admirable attempt" to develop a more targeted approach to arrhythmia treatment, and said it was "illuminating and far reaching". He particularly liked the advocated approach of segregating drug targets by disease state. Kowey said the book's main weakness was a lack of focus on clinical issues – both in topics covered and author selection. He noted that bringing drugs to the marketplace is expensive and proof of concept clinical trials are necessary to justify the investment. He said "Billman should be congratulated for his willingness to take on what is clearly an extraordinarily complex problem area" and praised him for "[encouraging] blue sky thinking" is his contributions to the book. He also congratulated the chapter authors for making "complex discussions not only interpretable, but topical". Kowey concluded "I would recommend this book to my colleagues and fellows, not only as a reference source, but as a compendium of information that summarizes where we are, and most importantly, the path we must take."

In a review for ChemMedChem, medicinal chemistry professor Ahmed S. Mehanna agreed that Novel Therapeutic Targets for Antiarrhythmic Drugs did not adequately cover clinical aspects of drug development. He also said the book could have been better organized and focused too heavily on describing known research, as opposed to the novel treatments implied by the book's title. He did, however, say the book "gives very valuable and comprehensive reviews of arrhythmia and its pharmacological management." Mehanna said the book reviewed topics appropriately and was free of obvious errors. Overall, he recommended the book, calling it "a worthwhile addition to the literature on cardiac arrhythmia and antiarrhythmic drugs."
