= George Billman =

American physiologist (born 1954)

George Edward Billman
- Born: July 23, 1954 (age 72); Fort Worth, Texas
- Education: Xavier University; University of Kentucky
- Known for: Studying the effects of exercise training and omega-3 fatty acids on the cardiovascular system
- Spouse: Rosemary (1975–)
- Children: 2
- Scientific career
- Fields: Physiology
- Workplaces: University of Oklahoma; Ohio State University
- Thesis: The Neural Control of the Coronary Circulation during Behavioral Stress in Conscious Dogs (1980)
- Doctoral advisor: David C. Randall

George Edward Billman (born July 23, 1954) is an American physiologist and professor at Ohio State University. After receiving a Ph.D from the University of Kentucky in 1980, Billman began his professional career at the University of Oklahoma. In 1984, he joined the Ohio State staff, where he became an associate professor in 1990 and a full professor in 1996.

Billman's research has focused on cardiovascular function, in particular its role in the induction of ventricular fibrillation (VF). He developed non-invasive methods to study autonomic neural regulation of the heart, using a canine model of sudden cardiac death (SCD). These techniques have subsequently been used in human patients to identify people at high risk for VF. Billman has used his sudden cardiac death models to study the effects of exercise training on susceptibility to SCD and the effects of omega-3 fatty acids, among other things. Due to his use of live animals in experiments, Billman has been criticized by animal rights activists; however, a 2009 regulatory investigation found no evidence of wrongdoing.

== Early life and education ==
George Edward Billman was born on July 23, 1954, in Fort Worth, Texas. He attended Xavier University, graduating cum laude in 1975 with a bachelor's degree in natural science. He did his doctoral work at the University of Kentucky, earning a Ph.D. in physiology and biophysics in 1980. From 1980 to 1982, Billman was a research associate under H. Lowell Stone at the University of Oklahoma.

== Career ==
In 1982, Billman was promoted to Assistant Professor of Research at Oklahoma. In 1984, he accepted an assistant professor position at Ohio State University. He was promoted to associate professor in 1990 and made a full professor in 1996. Billman was elected a Fellow of the American Heart Association in 2001. In 2011, he was elected a Fellow of the Heart Rhythm Society. He is also a member of The Physiological Society in London, the American Physiological Society, the International Society for the Study of Fatty Acids and Lipids (ISSFAL), and Sigma Xi.

Billman has served on the editorial boards of the American Journal of Physiology: Regulatory, Integrative and Comparative Physiology (2004–2007), Current Cardiology Reviews (2004–), Experimental Physiology (2006−2010), the Journal of Cardiovascular Pharmacology and Therapeutics (2001–), and the Journal of Applied Physiology (2007–). He was an associate editor of Pharmacology & Therapeutics from 1999–2014. In June 2014, he was selected as the editor-in-chief of the recently formed Frontiers in Physiology, a position he continues to hold as of 2014.

Billman consulted for Eli Lilly from 1987–1988, Glaxo from 1989–1991, Procter & Gamble from 1995–99. He has been a consultant for Sanofi Aventis since 1999.

== Research ==
Billman's research has focused on cardiovascular physiology with an emphasis on ventricular fibrillation (VF) and the cardiovascular system's response to stress. His work has led to non-invasive (electrocardiograph) techniques to detect susceptibility to sudden cardiac death (SCD) in dogs. These electrocardiographic markers have subsequently been used clinically on humans. Billman has studied the effects of omega-3 fatty acids on the heart and circulatory system. He has also studied the effects of exercise training and novel pharmaceutics on the test subject's susceptibility to fatal cardiac arrhythmias. He has performed experiments on live research dogs and using isolated ventricular myocytes.

=== Model of sudden cardiac death ===
Billman developed a technique of inducing fatal ventricular fibrillation in dogs in the lab of H. Lowell Stone starting in 1980, and used and refined it over the next 25 years. The model subsequently has been described as "an elegant in vivo model of sudden cardiac death" by cardiologist Michel de Lorgeril et al. and "a highly reliable canine model of sudden cardiac death" by physiologist Alexander Leaf et al. The model is described in Springer's handbook of reliable procedures for testing the potential effects of new drug candidates in the antiarrhythmic section.

In the procedure, the left main anterior coronary artery is surgically blocked, and a hydraulic cuff is placed around the left circumflex coronary artery, allowing the artery to be blocked on demand. Experiments proceed after a month of recovery and treadmill training. Under stress from exercise combined with the blocking of the arteries, 50–60% of dogs enter fatal ventricular fibrillation within 2 minutes. These dogs are labeled susceptible, while the other 40–50% are labeled resistant. Dogs that enter VF are defibrillated, allowing for repeated study of the same animals. Over time, initial results (fibrillation or no fibrillation) have proven to be 92% reproducible, allowing for precise testing of potential antiarrhythmic agents.

This model of sudden cardiac death has "yielded important insights" into ischaemic heart disease. The initial study using the technique, published in 1982, found that decreased baroreflex sensitivity was associated with increased risk for ventricular fibrillation. This marked the first time an autonomic response was seen as having prognostic value. The same association was demonstrated in humans by Kleiger et al. in 1987 and "definitively" demonstrated in dogs in 1988 by Schwartz, Billman, et al.. Based on these findings, a large clinical study (Autonomic Tone and Reflexes After MI) was conducted. The 1,284 patient study "fully confirmed" baroreflex sensitivity as a valid predictor of sudden and non-sudden death after myocardial infarction (MI).

Billman's model of SCD has also shown that sudden death is not a direct function of the degree of a myocardial infarction and that baroreflex gain declines during MI. Resistant dogs show a reduced heart rate during ischemia, while susceptible dogs show increased heart rate (beyond that induced by the exercise). Reviewing the findings, physiologist Dwain L. Eckberg wrote that the model "seems to be extremely relevant" to human patients at risk for sudden cardiac death.

=== Cocaine and heart function ===
According to a 1990 review article by Billman, cocaine has two primary circulatory effects – increased sympathetic stimulation and cardiac ion channel inhibition – that lead to a variety of heart problems. The drug also causes increased heart rate and blood pressure. In a 1995 review article, he said resulting secondary effects include arrhythmia, coronary vasospasm, myocardial infarction, and ventricular fibrillation.

=== Omega-3 fatty acids ===
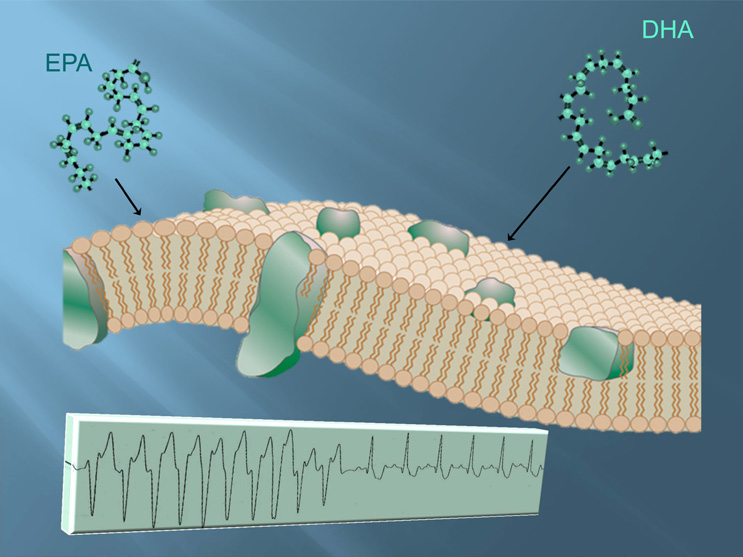
Diagram showing the interaction between omega-3 fatty acids and the cardiac cell membrane (top) with the possible effect on ventricular arrhythmia (bottom).

In 1994, Billman used his model of SCD to test the ability of omega-3 polyunsaturated fatty acids to prevent fatal arrhythmias. In the test, eight dogs otherwise susceptible to ventricular fibrillation were given a direct infusion of fish oil. Seven of the eight did not have VF during the test. Five of five animals retested in a follow-up control test (i.e, without treatment) had VF. The observed effect most likely resulted from a combination of direct chemical interaction on the cardiac cell membrane and a reduced heart rate caused by the omega-3s. The study was picked up by a nationally syndicated columnist, and thus reported in various popular media outlets. Follow-up studies in 1997 and 1999 confirmed the results (P<0.005) and found both eicosapentaenoic acid and docosahexaenoic acid (found in fish oil), as well as α-Linolenic acid (found in vegetable oil) to have antiarrhythmic effects.

The same effect has been shown to occur in humans by other researchers. Billman's more recent work has focused on discovering the biochemical mechanisms of the antiarrhythmic effects of omega-3 fatty acids and on whether the same protection can be gained through dietary omega-3 fatty acids. A 2003 review of the research suggested the effect was due to electrophysiological properties of free omega-3s in sarcolemma. Dietary fatty acids are incorporated into membrane phospholipids and are then released during ischemia, suggesting a possible mechanism whereby the cardiac muscle is more resistant to developing arrhythmia under stress. However, large-scale clinical trials of dietary omega-3s have been inconclusive, with some studies finding a significant reduction in sudden cardiac death and others finding no effect. Meta-analysis performed in 2014, found a statistically significant reduction in sudden cardiac death (odds ratio (OR) 0.86; confidence interval (CI) 0.76 to 0.98), while a 2013 meta-analysis using a different data set found a non-statistically significant reduction (OR 0.82; CI 0.60 to 1.21).

=== Response to research ===
Billman's experiments have been protested by animal rights activists. In 2007, a local group known as Protect Our Earth's Treasures, spurred by Ohio State approving the use of up to 120 additional dogs, protested Billman's research. Specifically, they were against the surgical blocking of arteries in Billman's model of sudden cardiac death and the subsequent euthanizing of surviving animals for future study. In April 2009, PETA, which had long questioned Billman's techniques, filed formal complaints with the U.S. Department of Agriculture and the NIH's Office of Laboratory Animal Welfare. They alleged he was conducting redundant experiments and using unnecessarily cruel techniques. Ohio State said PETA's claims "grossly misrepresented and severely discounted the scientific merit and potential public health benefit of this work." Two federal investigations found no evidence of wrongdoing, but PETA continued to campaign against the experiments. In 2010, Ohio State issued an open letter in response to continued protest letters. In the statement, OSU said PETA was misleading the public by saying Billman's research was investigating the "obvious" fact that "exercise strengthens the heart" when the research was actually attempting to understand the biochemical and cellular mechanisms that lead to sudden cardiac death.

Billman received a new investigator award from the National Institutes of Health (NIH) from 1983−1986. He was the principal investigator on NIH R01 grants starting in 1986, 1995, 2002, and 2007, and on a National Institute on Drug Abuse R01 grant starting in 1990. He has also led studies paid for by Hoffmann-La Roche, Merck, and Sanofi-Aventis.

== Personal life ==
George Billman and his wife, Rosemary, have been married since 1975. The couple has two children – George T. and Elyse T. Billman. He is an avid amateur genealogist, and has determined that his own ancestor, Hans Theobald Billmann, who emigrated to the United States in 1752, was not in turn descended from ancestors previously identified by other amateur researchers.

== Publications ==
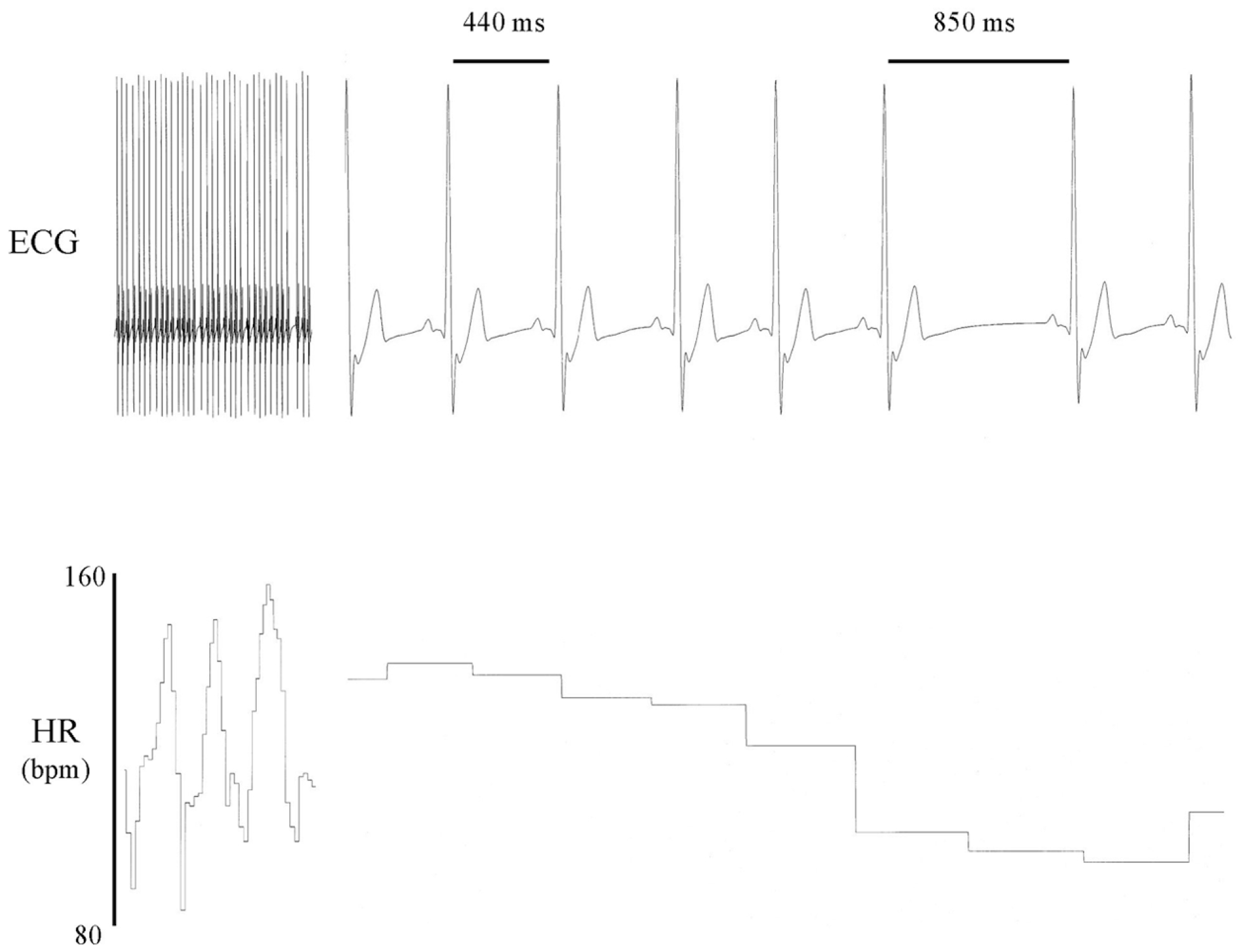
In 2011, Billman published a review article on heart rate variability, illustrated here by an electrocardiogram recording of canine heartbeat.

Billman has authored or co-authored more than 150 scientific papers, which have been cited more than 5000 times in peer-reviewed research. According to Web of Science, he has an h-index of 38, with 11 papers receiving more than 100 citations. Billman was the editor of the 2010 book Novel Therapeutic Targets for Antiarrhythmic Drugs published by John Wiley and Sons, and contributed three chapters to it. According to the publisher, the book describes the state of cardiac arrhythmia treatment and future directions the research may take. In a review of the book, Peter R. Kowey praised Billman for "[encouraging] blue sky thinking" in his contributions.

=== Books ===
- Shayne Cox Gad, ed. (2005). "Cardiac Sarcolemmal ATP-Sensitive Potassium Channel Antagonists: Novel Ischemia-Selective Antiarrhythmic Agents". Drug Discovery Handbook. John Wiley & Sons. ISBN 978-0-471-21384-0.
- Stefan Dhein; et al., eds. (2005). "In-Vivo Models of Arrhythmias: a Canine Model of Sudden Cardiac Death". Practical Methods in Cardiovascular Research. Springer. ISBN 978-3-540-40763-8.
- Novel Therapeutic Targets for Antiarrhythmic Drugs. (editor). John Wiley & Sons. 2010. ISBN 978-0-470-56140-9.
- The Effects of Omega-3 Polyunsaturated Fatty Acids on Cardiac Rhythm: Antiarrhythmic, Proarrhythmic, Both or Neither? (editor). Frontiers. 2013. ISBN 978-2889190881.

=== Selected journal articles ===
- Billman, G. E.; Schwartz, P. J.; Stone, H. L. (1982). "Baroreceptor reflex control of heart rate: a predictor of sudden cardiac death". Circulation. 66 (4): 874–880. doi:10.1161/01.CIR.66.4.874. PMID 7116603.
- Billman, G. E.; Schwartz, P. J.; Stone, H. L. (1984). "The effects of daily exercise on susceptibility to sudden cardiac death". Circulation. 69 (6): 1182–1189. doi:10.1161/01.CIR.69.6.1182. PMID 6713619.
- Schwartz, P. J.; Vanoli, E.; Stramba-Badiale, M.; De Ferrari, G. M.; Billman, G. E.; Foreman, R. D. (1988). "Autonomic mechanisms and sudden death. New insights from analysis of baroreceptor reflexes in conscious dogs with and without a myocardial infarction". Circulation. 78 (4): 969–979. doi:10.1161/01.CIR.78.4.969. PMID 3168199.
- Billman, G. E. (May 1990). "Mechanisms responsible for the cardiotoxic effects of cocaine". The FASEB Journal. 4 (8): 2469–75. doi:10.1096/fasebj.4.8.2185973. PMID 2185973. S2CID 39609454.
- Billman, G. E.; Hallaq, H.; Leaf, A. (May 10, 1994). "Prevention of ischemia-induced ventricular fibrillation by omega 3 fatty acids". PNAS. 91 (10): 4427–4430. Bibcode:1994PNAS...91.4427B. doi:10.1073/pnas.91.10.4427. PMC 43798. PMID 8183925.
- Billman, George E.; Kang, Jing X.; Leaf, Alexander (1999). "Prevention of sudden cardiac death by dietary pure ω-3 polyunsaturated fatty acids in dogs". Circulation. 99 (18): 2452–2457. doi:10.1161/01.CIR.99.18.2452. PMID 10318669.
- Billman GE (February 1, 2002). "Aerobic exercise conditioning: a nonpharmacological antiarrhythmic intervention". Journal of Applied Physiology. 92 (2): 446–54. doi:10.1152/japplphysiol.00874.2001. PMID 11796650. S2CID 6404030.
- Leaf A, Kang JX, Xiao YF, Billman GE (2003). "Clinical prevention of sudden cardiac death by n-3 polyunsaturated fatty acids and mechanism of prevention of arrhythmias by n-3 fish oils". Circulation. 107 (21): 2646–2652. doi:10.1161/01.CIR.0000069566.78305.33. PMID 12782616.
- Billman, George E. (September 2006). "A comprehensive review and analysis of 25 years of data from an in vivo canine model of sudden cardiac death: Implications for future anti-arrhythmic drug development". Pharmacology & Therapeutics. 111 (3): 808–835. doi:10.1016/j.pharmthera.2006.01.002. PMID 16483666.
- Billman, George E. (October 1, 2009). "Cardiac autonomic neural remodeling and susceptibility to sudden cardiac death: effect of endurance exercise training". American Journal of Physiology. 297 (4): H1171–93. doi:10.1152/ajpheart.00534.2009. PMID 19684184. S2CID 14822283.
- Billman GE, Nishijima Y, Belevych AE, Terentyev D, Xu Y, Haizlip KM, Monasky MM, Hiranandani N, Harris WS, Gyorke S, Carnes CA, Janssen PM (April 1, 2010). "Effects of dietary omega–3 fatty acids on ventricular function in dogs with healed myocardial infarctions: in vivo and in vitro studies". American Journal of Physiology. Heart and Circulatory Physiology. 298 (4): 1219–1228. doi:10.1152/ajpheart.01065.2009. PMC 2853418. PMID 20097770.
- Billman, George E. (November 29, 2011). "Heart rate variability–a historical perspective". Frontiers in Physiology. 2: 86. doi:10.3389/fphys.2011.00086. PMC 3225923. PMID 22144961.
- Billman, George E. (October 2013). "The effects of omega-3 polyunsaturated fatty acids on cardiac rhythm: A critical reassessment". Pharmacology & Therapeutics. 140 (1): 53–80. doi:10.1016/j.pharmthera.2013.05.011. PMID 23735203.
