= Eurotech =

Eurotech may refer to:

- Eurotech (company)
- EuroTech Universities Alliance
