= Small (journal) =

- Discipline: Microtechnology Nanotechnology
- Language: English
- Edited by: José Oliveira

Publication details
- History: 2005-present
- Publisher: Wiley-VCH
- Frequency: Weekly
- Open access: Hybrid
- Impact factor: 13.0 (2023)

Standard abbreviations
- ISO 4: Small

Indexing
- CODEN: SMALBC
- ISSN: 1613-6810 (print); 1613-6829 (web)
- LCCN: 2005234010
- OCLC no.: 971917873

Links
- Journal homepage; Online access; Online archive

Small is a weekly peer-reviewed scientific journal covering micro- and nanotechnology. It was established in 2005 as a monthly journal, switched to biweekly in 2009, and to weekly in 2015. It is published by Wiley-VCH and the editor-in-chief is José Oliveira. According to the Journal Citation Reports, the journal has a 2023 impact factor of 13.0.

== See also ==
- Advanced Materials
- Advanced Functional Materials
- Advanced Engineering Materials
- Advanced Science
- Small Science
