= Jingdong Zhang =

Chinese–Danish chemist (1968–2020)

- Born: June 2, 1968
- Died: January 9, 2020 (aged 51)
- Education: Shanghai University; Chinese Academy of Sciences
- Scientific career
- Workplaces: Technical University of Denmark; Kyushu University

Jingdong Zhang (June 2, 1968 – January 9, 2020) was a Chinese–Danish chemist and professor of chemistry at the Technical University of Denmark. Her research considered nanochemistry and the novel materials for catalysis, as well as the development of advanced characterisation techniques such as scanning tunnelling microscopy and atomic force microscopy. She was elected to the Akademiet for de Tekniske Videnskaber in 2017.

== Early life and education ==
Zhang was born in 1968 in China. She studied chemistry and environmental engineering at Shanghai University. After earning her master's degree, Zhang moved to the Chinese Academy of Sciences' Changchun Institute of Applied Chemistry (CIAC) for her graduate research. Here she worked under the supervision of Erkang Wang.

== Research and career ==
Zhang was appointed to the Exploratory Research for Advanced Technology (ERATO) project, which saw her working on electrochemiscopy at the Kyushu University in Sendai, Japan. She joined the faculty at the Technical University of Denmark in 1998, where she was eventually promoted to professor in 2016. Her research considered electrochemistry for nanomedicines and sustainable energy. In particular, she was interested in the electrochemistry that occurs at interfaces. During the late nineties, electrochemistry rapidly grew as a research area, integrating aspects of solid state physics and materials science. Zhang was quick to pick up new materials and characterisation techniques, including atomic force microscopy at single molecule resolution. She was particularly interested in redox metalloproteins and enzymes and new (bio)electrochemical surfaces. These surfaces included graphene, nanoparticles and nanoporous metallic surfaces.

She was awarded the Danish Society of Engineers Agnes and Betzy Prize in 2011. The following year she was elected to the Royal Danish Academy of Sciences and Letters. In 2017 Zhang was appointed to the Akademiet for de Tekniske Videnskaber. Zhang was a member of the editorial board of ChemElectroChem. A special issue of ChemElectroChem honouring Zhang and her legacy was published in 2021.

== Select publications ==
- Jingdong Zhang; Alexander M. Kuznetsov; Igor G. Medvedev; Qijin Chi; Tim Albrecht; Palle S. Jensen; Jens Ulstrup (2008). "Single-Molecule Electron Transfer in Electrochemical Environments". Chemical Reviews. 108 (7): 2737–2791. doi:10.1021/cr068073+. PMID 18620372. Wikidata Q57660246.
- Qijin Chi; Jingdong Zhang; Jens U. Nielsen; Esben P. Friis; Ib Chorkendorff; Gerard W. Canters; Jens E. T. Andersen; Jens Ulstrup (2000). "Molecular Monolayers and Interfacial Electron Transfer ofPseudomonas aeruginosaAzurin on Au(111)". Journal of the American Chemical Society. 122 (17): 4047–4055. doi:10.1021/ja993174t. Wikidata Q57660330.
- Ruizhen Li; Yong Liu; Ling Cheng; Changzhu Yang; Jingdong Zhang (2014). "Photoelectrochemical aptasensing of kanamycin using visible light-activated carbon nitride and graphene oxide nanocomposites". Analytical Chemistry. 86 (19): 9372–9375. doi:10.1021/ac502616n. PMID 25219771. Wikidata Q38304226.

== Personal life ==
Zhang was married to Qijin Chi, a chemist at the Technical University of Denmark, with whom she had one son.
