= Small Science (journal) =

Academic journal

- Discipline: Microtechnology Nanotechnology
- Language: English
- Edited by: Ekaterina Perets

Publication details
- History: 2021-present
- Publisher: Wiley-VCH
- Frequency: Monthly
- Open access: Yes
- Impact factor: 8.3 (2024)

Standard abbreviations
- ISO 4: Small Sci.

Indexing
- CODEN: SSMCBJ
- ISSN: 2688-4046
- OCLC no.: 1111090069

Links
- Journal homepage; Online access; Online archive

Small Science is a peer-reviewed scientific journal covering micro- and nanotechnology. It was established in 2021 as a monthly journal. It is published by Wiley-VCH and the editor-in-chief is Ekaterina Perets. According to the Journal Citation Reports, the journal has a 2024 impact factor of 8.3.

== See also ==
- Small (journal)
