= Laser & Photonics Reviews =

- Discipline: Optical science
- Language: English
- Edited by: Katja Paff

Publication details
- History: 2007–present
- Publisher: Wiley-VCH
- Frequency: Bimonthly
- Open access: Hybrid
- Impact factor: 9.7 (2025)

Standard abbreviations
- ISO 4: Laser Photonics Rev.

Indexing
- CODEN: LPRAB8
- ISSN: 1863-8880 (print); 1863-8899 (web)
- OCLC no.: 633081680

Links
- Journal homepage; Online access; Online archive

Laser & Photonics Reviews is a bimonthly peer-reviewed scientific journal covering research on all aspects of optical science. It is published by Wiley-VCH and contains reviews and original papers/letters. The journal was established in 2007 by the founding editor-in-chief Theodor W. Hänsch (LMU Munich). Originally, the journal only published review articles. Since 2012, it also contains original papers and letters.

According to the Journal Citation Reports, the journal has a 2025 impact factor of 9.7.
