= Angewandte =

Angewandte may refer to:

- Angewandte Chemie, a peer-reviewed chemistry journal
- University of Applied Arts Vienna, a university of higher education in Austria
