= ChemPlusChem =

- Discipline: Chemistry
- Language: English
- Edited by: Ulrike Kauscher Pinto

Publication details
- Former names: Collection tschechischer chemischer Forschungsarbeiten, Collection of Czechoslovak Chemical Communications
- History: 2012–present
- Publisher: Wiley-VCH on behalf of Chemistry Europe
- Frequency: Monthly
- Open access: Hybrid
- Impact factor: 3.1 (2025)

Standard abbreviations
- ISO 4: ChemPlusChem

Indexing
- CODEN: CHEMM5
- ISSN: 2192-6506
- OCLC no.: 852682751

Links
- Journal homepage; Online access; Online archive; Archive (1929–2011)

ChemPlusChem is a monthly peer-reviewed scientific journal covering chemistry and published by Wiley-VCH on behalf of Chemistry Europe. It was established in 1929 by E. Votoček and J. Heyrovský and renamed in 1939 to Collection tschechischer chemischer Forschungsarbeiten/Collection des travaux chimiques tchèques/Collection of Czech Chemical Communications for one year. Publication was suspended until 1947, when it resumed publication as Collection of Czechoslovak Chemical Communications. It obtained its current name in 2012.

== Abstracting and indexing ==
The journal is abstracted and indexed in:

- Chemical Abstracts Service
- Chemistry Citation Index
- Current Contents/Physical, Chemical & Earth Sciences
- Science Citation Index Expanded
- Scopus

According to the Journal Citation Reports, the journal has a 2025 impact factor of 3.1.
