= Advanced Materials =

- Discipline: Materials science
- Language: English
- Edited by: Irem Bayindir-Buchhalter and Esther Levy

Publication details
- History: 1989–present
- Publisher: Wiley-VCH
- Frequency: Weekly
- Open access: Hybrid
- Impact factor: 26.8 (2024)

Standard abbreviations
- ISO 4: Adv. Mater.

Indexing
- CODEN: ADVMEW
- ISSN: 0935-9648 (print); 1521-4095 (web)
- LCCN: 90656517
- OCLC no.: 21104347

Links
- Journal homepage; Online access; Online archive

Advanced Materials is a weekly peer-reviewed scientific journal covering materials science. It includes communications, reviews, and feature articles on topics in chemistry, physics, nanotechnology, ceramics, metallurgy, and biomaterials. According to the Journal Citation Reports, the journal has a 2023 impact factor of 26.8.

== History ==
The journal was established in 1988 as a supplement to the general chemistry journal Angewandte Chemie and remained part of that journal for the first eighteen months of its existence. Founder and editor-in-chief was Peter Goelitz (then editor of Angewandte Chemie). The current editors-in-chief are Irem Bayindir-Buchhalter and Esther Levy.

Originally the journal appeared monthly; it switched to fifteen issues in 1997, eighteen issues in 1998, and twenty-four issues in 2000. In 2009, it started to publish weekly, with forty-eight issues per year. Since 2018, it publishes fifty-two issues per year.

== Sister journals ==
As the volume of research in materials science increased significantly since the 1990s, several journals have been spun off, including:

- Advanced Engineering Materials, 1999
- Advanced Functional Materials, 2001
- Small, 2005
- Advanced Energy Materials, 2011
- Advanced Healthcare Materials, 2012
- Advanced Optical Materials, 2013
- Advanced Materials Interfaces, 2014
- Advanced Electronic Materials, 2015
- Advanced Materials Technologies, 2016
- Small Methods, 2017
- Solar RRL, 2017
- Advanced Therapeutics, 2018
- Advanced Intelligent Systems, 2019
