= ChemistryOpen =

- Discipline: Chemistry
- Language: English
- Edited by: Francesca Rita Novara

Publication details
- History: 2012–present
- Publisher: Wiley-VCH on behalf of Chemistry Europe
- Frequency: Monthly
- Open access: Yes
- Impact factor: 3 (2025)

Standard abbreviations
- ISO 4: ChemistryOpen

Indexing
- CODEN: CHOPCK
- ISSN: 2191-1363
- OCLC no.: 780445472

Links
- Journal homepage; Online access; Online archive

ChemistryOpen is a monthly peer-reviewed, open access, scientific journal covering all areas of chemistry and related fields. It is published by Wiley-VCH on behalf of Chemistry Europe.

According to the Journal Citation Reports, the journal has a 2025 impact factor of 3, ranking it 124th out of 250 journals in the category "Chemistry, Multidisciplinary".
