= Gonzalo Cosa =

Argentinian-Canadian chemist

- Born: September 21, 1973 (age 53); Córdoba, Argentina
- Education: Universidad Nacional de Río Cuarto (Licenciate); University of Ottawa (Ph.D.)
- Known for: Fluorescence imaging, biophotonics, oxidative stress studies
- Awards: Canada Research Chair in Fluorescence Imaging and Biophotonics (2024); Bernard Belleau Award (2022); Canadian Society for Chemistry Keith Laidler Award (2015)
- Scientific career
- Fields: Chemistry, Biophotonics
- Workplaces: McGill University
- Doctoral advisor: J. C. (Tito) Scaiano
- Website: Official profile

Gonzalo Cosa is an Argentinian-Canadian chemist, professor, and researcher. He is the chair of the Department of Chemistry at McGill University and holds a Tier 1 Canada Research Chair in Fluorescence Imaging and Biophotonics. His research focuses on developing advanced optical probes and imaging techniques to study chemical processes in living cells, with applications in diagnostics, biomedical research, and healthcare.

== Education ==
Cosa earned his Licenciate in Chemistry in 1996 from the Universidad Nacional de Río Cuarto in Argentina, where he received the Asociación Química Argentina Award. In 2002, he completed his Ph.D. at the University of Ottawa under the supervision of J. C. (Tito) Scaiano; his doctoral research was recognized with the Governor General's Gold Medal and the International Union of Pure and Applied Chemistry Award for the best Ph.D. thesis in the chemical sciences. He then pursued postdoctoral studies at the University of Texas at Austin, working with Paul F. Barbara on single-molecule fluorescence studies.

== Career ==
In 2005, Cosa joined McGill University as an assistant professor, advancing to associate professor in 2011 and full professor in 2016. His research integrates photonics, nanotechnology, and biochemistry to develop tools that enable real-time observation of cellular processes with high specificity and minimal damage to healthy tissues. His work includes:

- Designing and synthesizing fluorescent molecular probes.
- Developing fluorescence microscopy methods for detailed visualization of chemical and biological processes.
- Investigating oxidative stress in cells and its implications for health and disease.

As Canada Research Chair in Fluorescence Imaging and Biophotonics, Cosa's work focuses on developing optical probes activated by specific cellular signals, providing insights into oxidative stress and supporting targeted therapies. His research also explores imaging techniques for studying viral replication, with applications in biomaterials, biomedical research, and healthcare.

== Awards and recognition ==
Cosa's contributions have been recognized with several awards, including:

- Tier 1 Canada Research Chair in Fluorescence Imaging and Biophotonics (2024)
- Canadian Society for Chemistry Bernard Belleau Award (2022)
- Fessenden Professorship (2017)
- Canadian Society for Chemistry Keith Laidler Award (2015)
- American Society for Photobiology New Investigator Award (2012)
- European Society for Photobiology Young Investigator Award (2009)
- Inter-American Photochemical Society Young Investigator Award (2009)
- IUPAC Prize for young Chemists (2003)
- Governor General's Gold Medal to the best Ph.D. Thesis in Sciences and Engineering, University of Ottawa (2002)
- Asociación Química Argentina (AQA) Award to highest CGPA (1997)

He has also served on editorial advisory boards for journals such as ChemPhotoChem and Langmuir and as an associate editor for Photochemistry and Photobiology.
