= Advanced Optical Materials =

- Discipline: Materials science, optical science
- Language: English
- Edited by: Peter Gregory

Publication details
- History: 2013–present
- Publisher: Wiley-VCH
- Frequency: Monthly
- Open access: Hybrid
- Impact factor: 7.2 (2025)

Standard abbreviations
- ISO 4: Adv. Opt. Mater.

Indexing
- CODEN: AOMDAX
- ISSN: 2195-1071
- LCCN: 2015207245
- OCLC no.: 828138675

Links
- Journal homepage; Online access; Online archive

Advanced Optical Materials is a monthly peer-reviewed scientific journal published by Wiley-VCH. It was established in 2013, after a section with the same name had been published since March 2012 in Advanced Materials. It covers all aspects of light–matter interactions. The founding editor-in-chief is Peter Gregory.

== Abstracting and indexing ==
The journal is abstracted and indexed in:

- Chemical Abstracts Service
- Current Contents/Engineering, Computing & Technology
- Current Contents/Physical, Chemical & Earth Sciences
- EBSCO databases
- Ei Compendex
- Inspec
- Science Citation Index Expanded
- Scopus

According to the Journal Citation Reports, the journal has a 2025 impact factor of 7.2.
