= Batteries & Supercaps =

- Discipline: Energy storage
- Language: English
- Edited by: Greta Heydenrych

Publication details
- History: Since 2018
- Publisher: Wiley-VCH on behalf of Chemistry Europe
- Frequency: Monthly
- Open access: Hybrid
- Impact factor: 4.7 (2024)

Standard abbreviations
- ISO 4: Batter. Supercaps

Indexing
- CODEN: BSAUBU
- ISSN: 2566-6223

Links
- Journal homepage

Batteries & Supercaps is a monthly peer-reviewed scientific journal covering electrochemical energy storage and its applications. It is published by Wiley-VCH on behalf of Chemistry Europe.

According to the Journal Citation Reports, the journal has a 2024 impact factor of 4.7.
