= ChemBioChem =

- Discipline: Chemical biology
- Language: English
- Edited by: Ruben Ragg

Publication details
- History: 2000–present
- Publisher: Wiley-VCH
- Frequency: 18/year
- Open access: Hybrid
- Impact factor: 3.461 (2021)

Standard abbreviations
- ISO 4: ChemBioChem

Indexing
- CODEN: CBCHFX
- ISSN: 1439-4227 (print); 1439-7633 (web)
- LCCN: 00256046
- OCLC no.: 45055848

Links
- Journal homepage; Online access; Online archive

ChemBioChem is a peer-reviewed scientific journal covering chemical biology, synthetic biology, and bio-nanotechnology and published by Wiley-VCH on behalf of Chemistry Europe. The journal publishes communications, full papers, reviews, minireviews, highlights, concepts, book reviews, and conference reports. Viewpoints, correspondence, essays, web sites, and databases are also occasionally featured. It is abstracted and indexed in major databases and has been online-only since 2016.

According to the Journal Citation Reports, the journal has a 2021 impact factor of 3.461.
