= Technical University of Denmark =

Public technical university in Kongens Lyngby, Denmark

- Danmarks Tekniske Universitet
- Other name: DTU
- Former names: Den Polytekniske Læreanstalt (1829–1933); Danmarks Tekniske Højskole (1933–1994)
- Motto: Technology for people
- Type: Public, Technical
- Established: 5 November 1829; 196 years ago
- Affiliations: EUA, TIME, CESAER and EuroTech
- Chairman: Karin Markides
- President: Anders Bjarklev
- Provost: Christine Nellemann
- Dean: Lars D. Christoffersen
- Director: Claus Nielsen
- Senior Vice President: Marianne Thellersen and Carsten Orth Gaarn-Larsen
- Academic staff: 2,003
- Administrative staff: 1540
- Students: 11,031
- Undergraduates: 7197
- Postgraduates: 3834
- Doctoral students: 1330
- Location: Kongens Lyngby, Lyngby-Taarbæk Municipality, Copenhagen, Denmark; 55°47′09″N 12°31′17″E
- Website: www.dtu.dk/

The Technical University of Denmark (Danish: Danmarks Tekniske Universitet), often simply referred to as DTU, is a polytechnic university and school of engineering. It was founded in 1829 at the initiative of Hans Christian Ørsted as Denmark's first polytechnic, and it is today ranked among Europe's leading engineering institutions. It is located in the town Kongens Lyngby, 12 km (7.5 mi) north of central Copenhagen, Denmark.

Along with École Polytechnique in Paris, École Polytechnique Fédérale de Lausanne, Eindhoven University of Technology, Technical University of Munich and Technion – Israel Institute of Technology, DTU is a member of EuroTech Universities Alliance.

== History ==
DTU was founded in 1829 as the "College of Advanced Technology" (Danish: Den Polytekniske Læreanstalt). The Physicist Hans Christian Ørsted, at that time a professor at the University of Copenhagen, was one of the driving forces behind this initiative. He was inspired by the École Polytechnique in Paris, France which Ørsted had visited as a young scientist. The new institution was inaugurated on 5 November 1829 with Ørsted becoming its Principal, a position he held until his death in 1851.

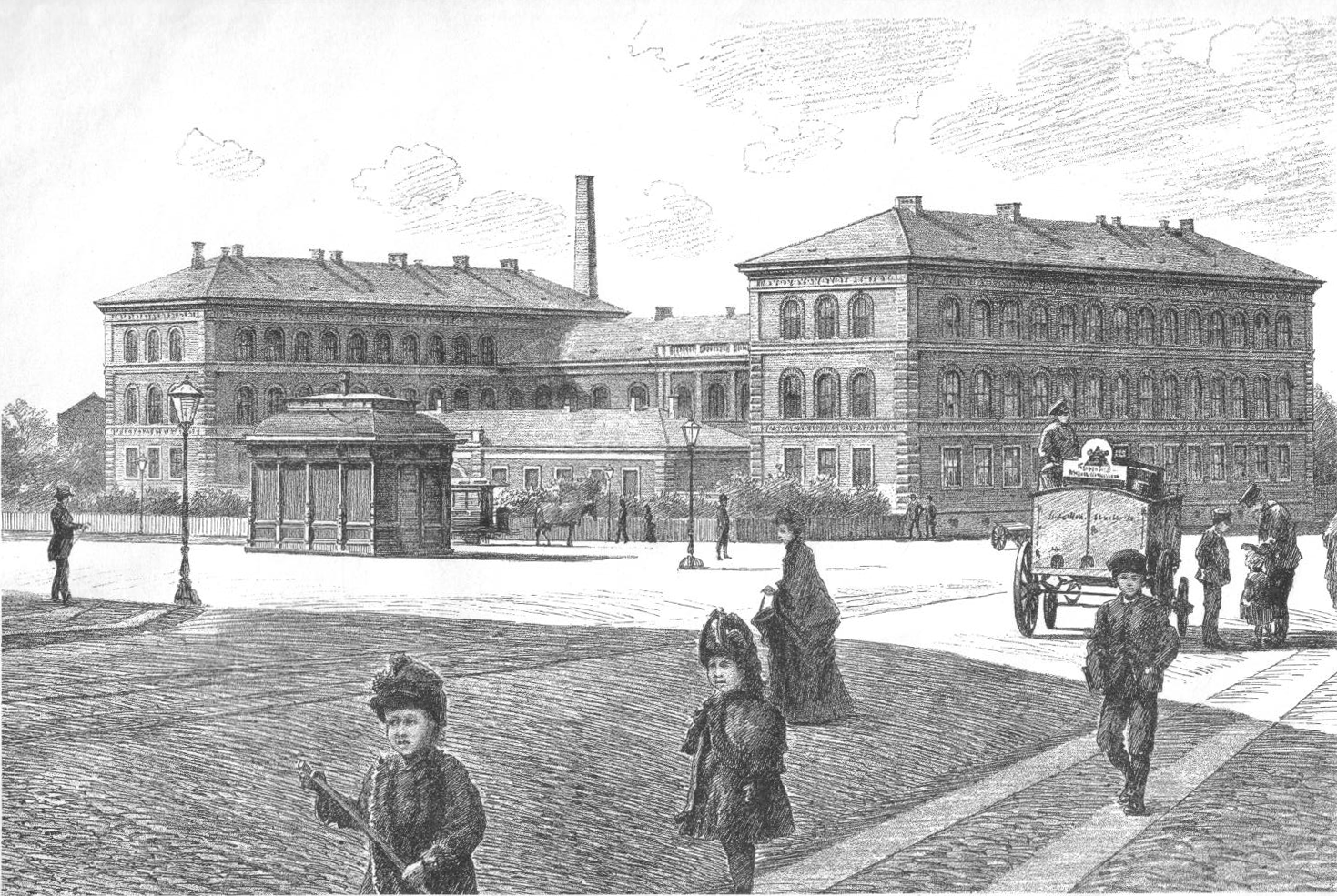
The College of Advanced Technology's premises in Sølvgade, completed 1889

The first home of the new college consisted of two buildings located in Studiestræde and St. Pederstræde in the center of Copenhagen. Although these buildings were expanded several times, they eventually became inadequate for the requirements of the college. In 1890 a new building complex was completed and inaugurated located in Sølvgade. The new buildings were designed by the architect Johan Daniel Herholdt.

In 1903, the College of Advanced Technology commenced the education of electrical engineers in addition to that of the construction engineers, the production engineers, and the mechanical engineers who already at that time were being educated at the college.

In the 1920s, space again became insufficient and in 1929 the foundation stone was laid for a new school at Østervold. Completion of this building was delayed by World War II and it was not completed before 1954.

From 1933, the institution was officially known as Danmarks tekniske Højskole (DtH), which commonly was translated into English, as the 'Technical University of Denmark'. On 1 April 1994, in connection with the joining of Danmarks Ingeniørakademi (DIA) and DTH, the Danish name was changed to Danmarks Tekniske Universitet, this done to include the word 'University' thus giving rise to the initials DTU by which the university is commonly known today. The formal name, Den Polytekniske Læreanstalt, Danmarks Tekniske Universitet, however, still includes the original name.

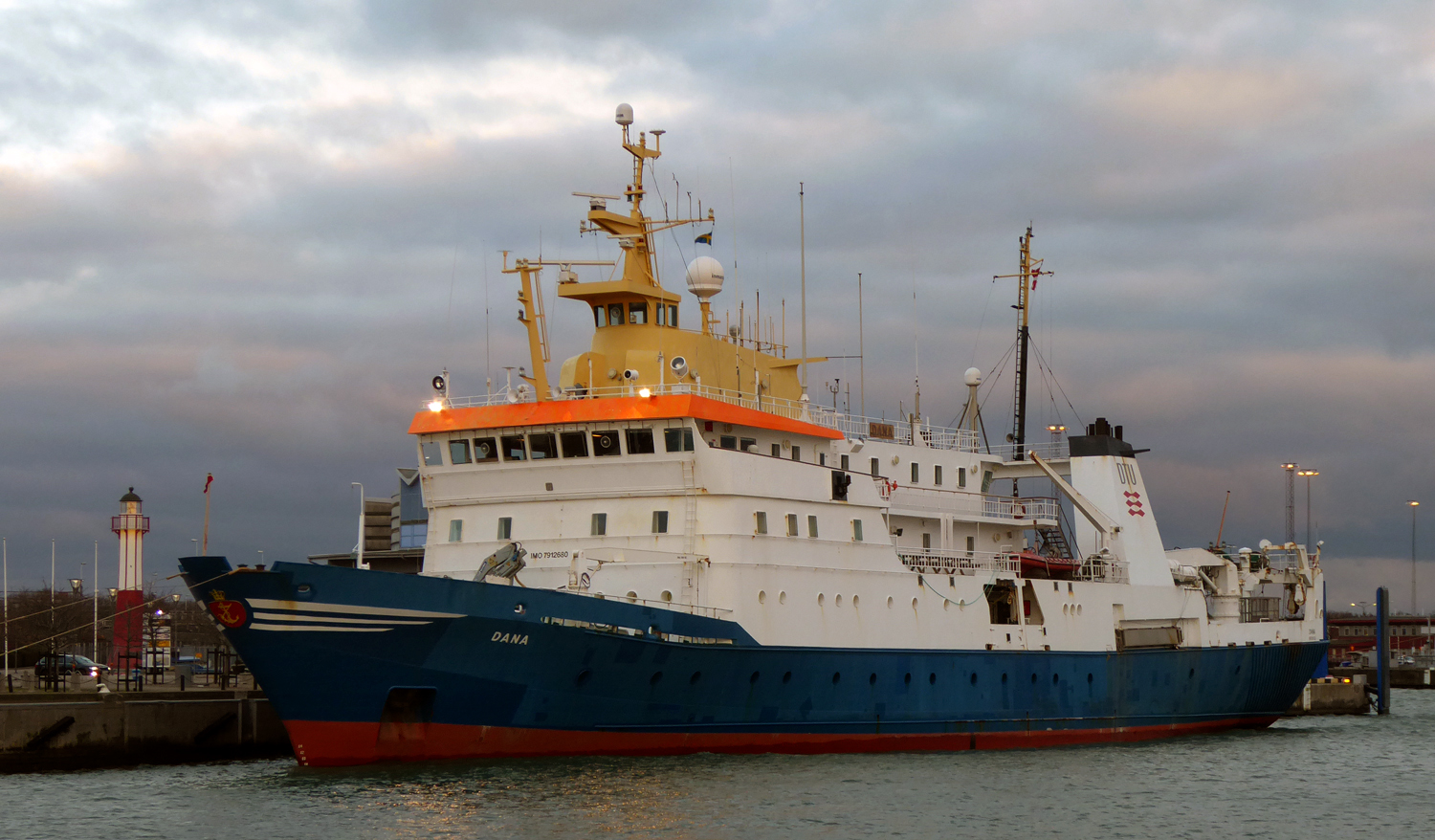
R/V Dana is DTU's research vessel, visiting Ystad 18 November 2016.

In 1960 a decision was made to move the College of Advanced Technology to new and larger facilities in Lyngby north of Copenhagen. They were inaugurated on 17 May 1974.

On 23 and 24 November 1967, the University Computing Center hosted the NATO Science Committee's Study Group first meeting discussing the newly coined term "Software Engineering".

On 1 January 2007, the university was merged with the following Danish research centers: Forskningscenter Risø, Danmarks Fødevareforskning, Danmarks Fiskeriundersøgelser (from 1 January 2008: National Institute for Aquatic Resources; DTU Aqua), Danmarks Rumcenter, and Danmarks Transport-Forskning.

== Organization and administration ==
The university is governed by a board consisting of 10 members: six members are recruited from outside the university and they form the majority of the board. One member is appointed by the scientific staff and one member is appointed by the administrative staff. Two members are appointed by the university students.

The President of DTU is appointed by the university board. The President in turn appoints the Deans, and the Deans appoint the Heads of the departments.

In 2014, DTU was granted institutional accreditation by the Danish Accreditation Institution (a member of ENQA). The institutional accreditation ensures that the quality assurance system of the institution is well-described, well-argued, and well-functioning in practice.

Since DTU has no faculty senate, and since the faculty is not involved in the appointment of the President, Deans, or Department heads, the university has no faculty governance.

== Departments and centres ==
- BRIGHT, Novo Nordisk Foundation Biotechnology Research Institute for the Green Transition
- DTU Aqua, National Institute for Aquatic Resources
- DTU Bioengineering, Department of Biotechnology and Biomedicine
- DTU Chemical Engineering, Department of Chemical and Biochemical Engineering
- DTU Chemistry, Department of Chemistry
- DTU Compute, Department of Applied Mathematics and Computer Science
- DTU Construct, Department of Civil and Mechanical Engineering
- DTU Electro, Department of Electrical and Photonics Engineering
- DTU Energy, Department of Energy Conversion and Storage
- DTU Engineering Technology, Department of Engineering Technology
- DTU Entrepreneurship, The Centre for Technology Entrepreneurship
- DTU Food, The National Food Institute
- DTU Health Tech, Department of Health Technology
- DTU Informatics and Mathematical Modelling
- DTU Learn for Life, Center for continuing and part-time education
- DTU Management, Department of Technology, Management and Economics
- DTU Nanolab, National Centre for Nano Fabrication and Characterization
- DTU Offshore, Danish Offshore Technology Centre
- DTU Physics, Department of Physics
- DTU Skylab, The Innovation Hub of DTU
- DTU Space, The National Space Institute
- DTU Sustain, Department of Environmental and Resource Engineering
- DTU Wind, Department of Wind Energy

=== DTU Engineering Technology ===
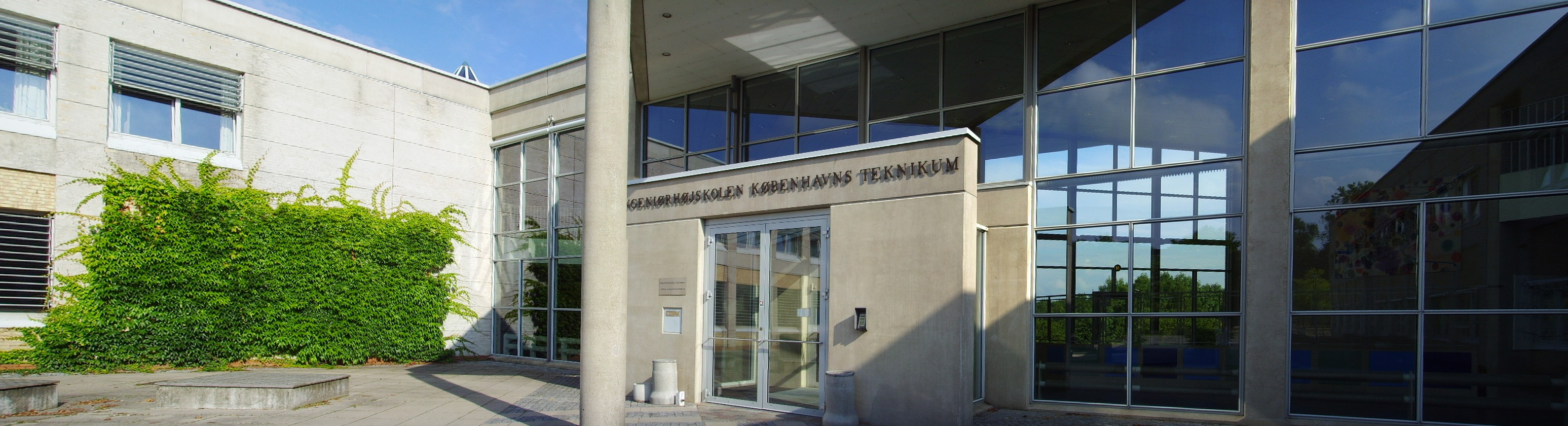
The main entrance to DTU Engineering Technology.

DTU Engineering Technology is the university's graduate engineering department (Danish: Center for Diplomingeniøruddannelse). Its facilities are located in Ballerup across 42.000 m^{2} (50.232 sq yd) of space designed by PLH Architects.

The institution was first established in 1881, as an independent university college known as Copenhagen University College of Engineering (Danish: Ingeniørhøjskolen i København). The University College of Engineering merged with DTU in 2013, at which point it became the school's graduate engineering department.

=== DTU Space ===
The National Space Institute at the Technical University of Denmark, also known as DTU Space (Danish: Institut for Rumforskning og Rumteknologi), is a Danish sector research institute within DTU. The institute conducts research in astrophysics, Solar System physics, geodesy, and space technology in collaboration with the Niels Bohr Institute for Astronomy, Geophysics and Physics. The institute currently leads Swarm, a project to investigate the properties of the Earth's magnetic field.

The institute was first established in 2005 as the Danish National Space Center through the merger of the Danish Space Research Institute and the geodesy part of the National Survey and Cadastre of Denmark. In 2008, the National Space Center was integrated into DTU, becoming DTU Space. It has a staff of 169, including researchers, engineers, and technicians.

== Research centers ==
- Arctic Technology Centre
- Center for Advanced Food Studies
- Centre for Applied Hearing Research
- Center for Biological Sequence Analysis – chair Søren Brunak
- Center for Electric Power and Energy
- Center for Electron Nanoscopy
- Center for Facilities Management
- Center for Information and Communication Technologies
- Center for Microbial Biotechnology
- Center for Phase Equilibria and Separation Processes
- Center for Technology, Economics and Management
- Center for Traffic and Transport
- Combustion and Harmful Emission Control
- DTU Fluid
- IMM Statistical Consulting Center
- International Centre for Indoor Environment and Energy
- The Danish Polymer Centre

=== Center for Electron Nanoscopy ===
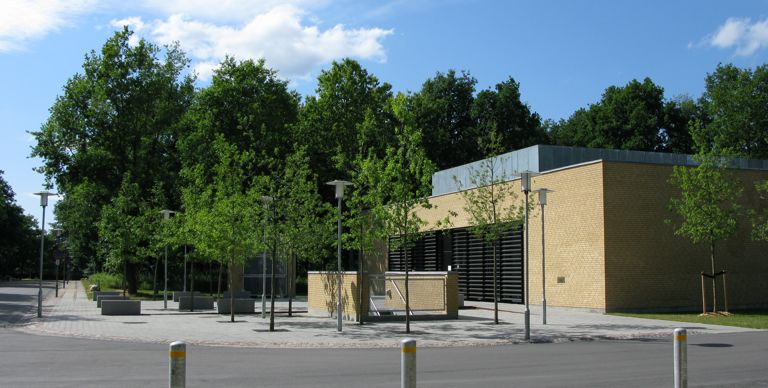
The Center for Electron Nanoscopy at the Lyngby campus.

The Center for Electron Nanoscopy (Danish: Center for Elektronnanoskopi, CEN) is a center for electron microscopy within the university. Inaugurated in December 2007, the institute was funded by a donation of DKK100 million from the A.P. Møller and Chastine Mc-Kinney Møller Foundation. DTU CEN houses seven electron microscopes built by FEI Company ranging from a standard scanning electron microscope to two highly specialized Titan transmission electron microscopes. The microscopes are available for use by both in-house and external users. They are housed in a new building designed especially for the microscopes, 314, and the offices are located on the first floor of the neighbouring building, 307.

=== Arctic research ===
The technical university is an active member of the University of the Arctic. UArctic is an international cooperative network based in the Circumpolar Arctic region, consisting of more than 200 universities, colleges, and other organizations with an interest in promoting education and research in the Arctic region.

The university participates in UArctic's mobility program north2north. The aim of that program is to enable students of member institutions to study in different parts of the North.

== Campus ==
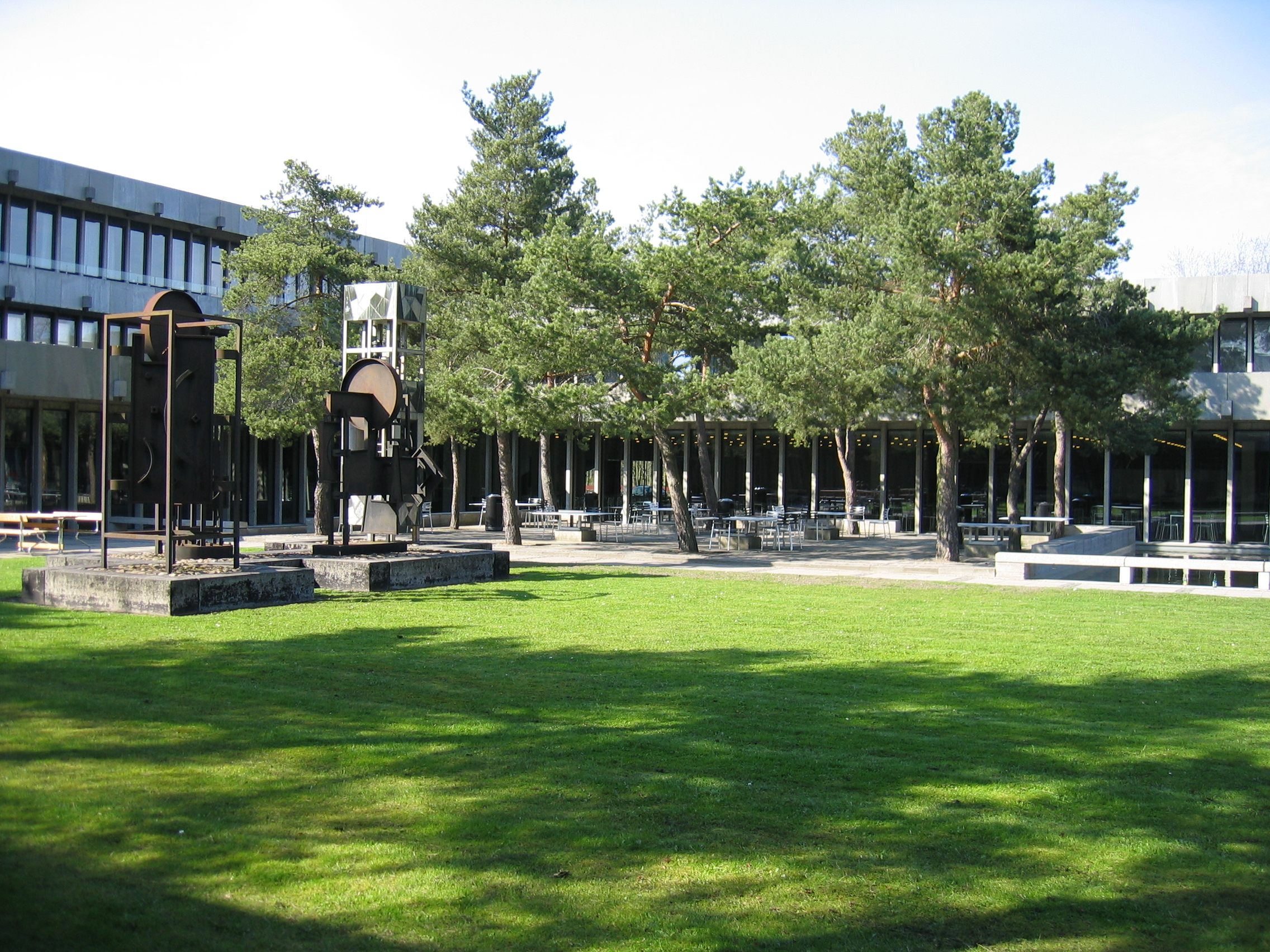
Main building in Lyngby.

The university is located on a plain known as Lundtoftesletten in the northeastern end of the city of Lyngby. The area was previously home to the airfield Lundtofte Flyveplads. The campus is roughly divided in half by the road Anker Engelunds Vej going in the east–west direction, and, perpendicular to that, by two lengthy, collinear roads located on either side of a parking lot. The campus is thus divided into four parts, referred to as quadrants, numbered one through four in correspondence with the conventional numbering of quadrants in the Cartesian coordinate system with north upwards.

=== DTU Risø Campus ===
The Risø Campus (55°41′35″N 12°05′54″E) is a satellite campus north of Roskilde which covers an area of more than 2.6 square kilometres. It houses a number of DTU's institutes, as well as Aarhus University's Department of Environmental Science and Department of Bioscience. The campus was formerly the site of the Risø National Laboratory for Sustainable Energy (Danish: Nationallaboratoriet for bæredygtig energi), a scientific research organization established in 1956 and merged into DTU in 2007, before finally being dissolved on 1 January 2012. The site is also host to the experimental Østerild Wind Turbine Test Field.

Wind Atlas Analysis and Application Program (WAsP) is a tool used in the wind energy industry to simulate wind flow over terrain and estimate the long-term power production of wind turbines and wind farms. It has been in development by Risø and DTU Wind Energy for over 30 years, and runs on PCs using Microsoft Windows.

=== DTU Campus Village ===
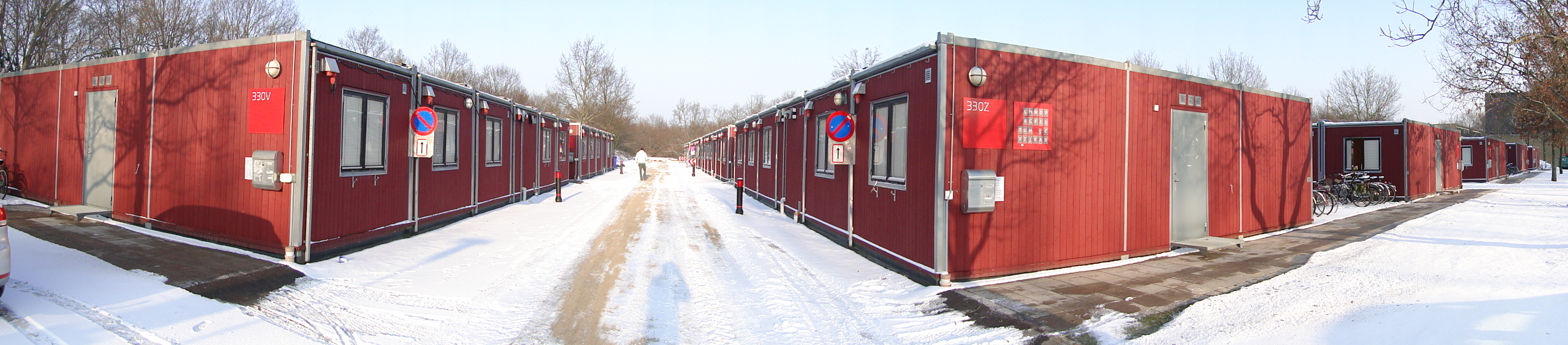
Panorama of DTU Campus Village in winter.

The Campus Village is an international student housing complex on the university's Lyngby campus at Elektrovej 330. It houses up to 224 international students, most of them staying for the duration of a semester or an academic year, and it is made up of identical red containers arranged in rows, housing up to ten students each. The Campus Village was constructed in the summer of 2001, and was opened as an international student dormitory starting in fall 2001. Residents staying in Campus Village may be participants of exchange or bilateral agreement programs between DTU and their home university.

Besides the Campus Village, several other dorm facilities are offered on campus. These are handled and rented out by UBSBOLIG.

== Controversy ==
DTU was the subject of controversy in 2009 because the (then) institute director of the Department of Chemistry, O.W. Sørensen, was a high-ranking member of Scientology. In relation to this, the university was accused of violating the principles of free speech by threatening to fire employees, among them Rolf W. Berg, who voiced their criticism of the institute director. On 7 April 2010, the successor of Sørensen was announced, at a department meeting, as Erling Stenby, who officially took over as Director on 1 May 2010.

== Rankings ==
University rankings

Global – Overall
- ARWU World: 151–200 (2025)
- QS World: 105 (2027)
- THE World: 110 (2027)

The university maintains an updated site with the university's standing in several relevant academic and research rankings. In November 2007 the Times Higher Education Supplement put the university as number 130 in their ranking of the universities of the world and number 122 in 2010.

- In "The World's Most Innovative Universities" 2015 ranking by Thomson Reuters, DTU is ranked:
  - No. 1 in the Nordic countries
  - No. 43 in the World
- In the "engineering" category in the QS subject rankings, DTU is ranked:
  - No. 2 in the Nordic countries
  - No. 36 in the World
- On the Leiden Ranking's 2008 "crown indicator" list of Europe's 100 largest universities in terms of the number of Web of Science publications in the period 2000–2007, DTU is ranked:
  - No. 1 in the Nordic countries
  - No. 5 in Europe
- In the 2022 QS World University Rankings DTU is ranked:
  - No. 99 in the World
- In the 2013 Leiden Ranking DTU is ranked:
  - No. 45 in the World
  - No. 7 in Europe
- In the 2013–2014 Times Higher Education World University Rankings DTU is ranked:
  - No. 121 in the World (No. 31 in the "Engineering & Technology" category)

== Extracurricular organizations ==
=== Sports ===
Exiles RUFC is the official rugby union club of DTU.

=== Student organizations ===
168-year-old Polyteknisk Forening, as well as the maritime student association Nul-kryds formed in 1947.

== Notable alumni and faculty ==
- Henrik Pontoppidan, Nobel Prize in Literature laureate
- Henrik Dam, Nobel Prize in Physiology or Medicine laureate
- Morten Peter Meldal, Nobel Prize in Chemistry (2022) laureate
- Harald Bohr (1887–1951), Olympic silver medalist football player and mathematician; brother of Niels Bohr
- Johan Jensen, mathematician
- Jorgen Arendt Jensen, scientist, engineer
- Carsten Thomassen, mathematician
- Ludwig A. Colding, physicist and civil engineer
- Martin Knudsen, physicist
- Morten Bo Madsen, physicist
- Rodney Cotterill, physicist
- Jakob Stoustrup, control theory scientist
- Andreas Mogensen, astronaut
- Ove Arup, founder of Arup Group
- Per Vilhelm Brüel, co-founder of Brüel & Kjær
- Craig R. Barrett, former CEO of Intel
- Jørgen Lindegaard, former CEO of the SAS Group
- Henrik O. Madsen, former CEO of DNV GL
- Dines Bjørner, computer scientist
- Anders Hejlsberg, software engineer
- Henrik Wann Jensen, computer graphics researcher
- Per Brinch Hansen, computer scientist
- Jakob Nielsen, web usability consultant
- Anker Engelund, civil engineer
- Povl Ole Fanger, HVAC engineer
- Peder Oluf Pedersen, electroacoustic engineer
- Poul Henningsen, author, architect and critic
- Ebbe Sand, former professional footballer
- Haldor Topsøe, Founder and former chairman of Haldor Topsøe
- Harald T. Friis, pioneering contributions to radio propagation, radio astronomy, and radar
- Jingdong Zhang, electrochemist and microscopist
- Jan S. Hesthaven, President, Karlsruhe Institute of Technology (KIT)
- Karen Chan, associate professor
- Jens Christian Refsgaard, emeritus professor at the Geological Survey of Denmark and Greenland
- Ademola Adenle, scholar and policy advisor

== See also ==
- Top Industrial Managers for Europe (TIME), network for student mobility
- Technologist, magazine published by EuroTech Universities Alliance
- Open access in Denmark
- Dana IV (ship)
