= ChemPhotoChem =

- Discipline: Photochemistry
- Language: English
- Edited by: Deanne Nolan

Publication details
- History: 2017–present
- Publisher: Wiley-VCH on behalf of Chemistry Europe
- Frequency: Monthly
- Open access: Hybrid
- Impact factor: 3.679 (2021)

Standard abbreviations
- ISO 4: ChemPhotoChem

Indexing
- CODEN: CHEMYH
- ISSN: 2367-0932
- OCLC no.: 1016397143

Links
- Journal homepage; Online access; Online archive

ChemPhotoChem is a monthly peer-reviewed scientific journal that covers pure and applied photochemistry. It is published by Wiley-VCH on behalf of Chemistry Europe. The journal publishes original research covering topics such as photovoltaics, photopharmacology, imaging, analytical chemistry, and synthesis. The editor-in-chief is Deanne Nolan.

According to the Journal Citation Reports, the journal has a 2021 impact factor of 3.679.
