= ChemistrySelect =

- Discipline: Chemistry
- Language: English
- Edited by: Jos Lenders

Publication details
- History: 2016–present
- Publisher: Wiley-VCH on behalf of Chemistry Europe
- Frequency: 48/year
- Open access: Hybrid
- Impact factor: 2.1 (2025)

Standard abbreviations
- ISO 4: ChemistrySelect

Indexing
- CODEN: CHEMUD
- ISSN: 2365-6549
- LCCN: 2016250754
- OCLC no.: 949945172

Links
- Journal homepage; Online access; Online archive

ChemistrySelect is a peer-reviewed scientific journal covering all areas of chemistry and adjacent fields. It is published by Wiley-VCH on behalf of Chemistry Europe.

== Abstracting and indexing ==
The journal is indexed in the Science Citation Index Expanded and Scopus.

According to the Journal Citation Reports, the journal has a 2025 impact factor of 2.1, ranking it 155nd out of 250 journals in the category "Chemistry, Multidisciplinary".
