= Karen Chan =

Canadian and French physicist

- Born: October 9, 1984 (age 41); Hong-Kong
- Citizenship: France, Canada
- Education: Simon Fraser University
- Awards: Villum Young Investigator, 2020
- Scientific career
- Workplaces: Technical University of Denmark; SLAC National Accelerator Laboratory
- Doctoral advisor: Michael Eikerling

Karen Chan is an associate professor at the Technical University of Denmark. She is a Canadian and French physicist most notable for her work on catalysis, electrocatalysis, and electrochemical reduction of carbon dioxide.

== Education ==
Chan earned her B.Sc. in Chemical Physics in 2007 and her PhD in Chemistry in 2013 from Simon Fraser University under Michael Eikerling.

== Academic career ==
Chan is known for her theoretical and computational work on the description of solid-liquid interfaces, electrocatalysis, batteries, and heterogeneous catalysis. Her work on computer simulations of the electrical double-layer and electrocatalysis has led to new ideas and understanding of, for instance, electrochemical carbon dioxide reduction, and water electrolysis.

Following the completion of her PhD, she served as a postdoctoral researcher at Stanford University and in 2016 was promoted to staff scientist at SLAC National Accelerator Laboratory. In October 2018, she began serving as an associate professor at the Technical University of Denmark.
