= ChemElectroChem =

- Discipline: Electrochemistry
- Language: English
- Edited by: Kate Lawrence

Publication details
- History: 2014–present
- Publisher: Wiley-VCH on behalf of Chemistry Europe
- Frequency: Biweekly
- Open access: Hybrid
- Impact factor: 4.782 (2021)

Standard abbreviations
- ISO 4: ChemElectroChem

Indexing
- CODEN: CHEMRA
- ISSN: 2196-0216
- LCCN: 2014268557
- OCLC no.: 869821608

Links
- Journal homepage

ChemElectroChem is a biweekly peer-reviewed scientific journal covering pure and applied electrochemistry. It is published by Wiley-VCH on behalf of Chemistry Europe. The journal publishes original research covering topics such as energy applications, electrochemistry at interfaces/surfaces, photoelectrochemistry, and bioelectrochemistry.

According to the Journal Citation Reports, the journal has a 2021 impact factor of 4.782.
