= ChemCatChem =

- Discipline: Catalysis
- Language: English
- Edited by: Sandra Gonzalez Gallardo

Publication details
- History: 2009–present
- Publisher: Wiley-VCH on behalf of Chemistry Europe
- Frequency: Biweekly
- Open access: Hybrid
- Impact factor: 3.9 (2024)

Standard abbreviations
- ISO 4: ChemCatChem

Indexing
- CODEN: CHEMK3
- ISSN: 1867-3899
- LCCN: 2009204183
- OCLC no.: 459787771

Links
- Journal homepage; Online access; Online archive

ChemCatChem is a biweekly peer-reviewed scientific journal covering heterogeneous, homogeneous, and biocatalysis. It is published by Wiley-VCH on behalf of Chemistry Europe. The chief editor is Sandra Gonzalez Gallardo.

According to the Journal Citation Reports, the journal has a 2024 impact factor of 3.9.
