= Chemistry Europe =

Organization of chemical societies

- Predecessor: ChemPubSoc Europe
- Formation: 1995
- Website: https://chemistry-europe.onlinelibrary.wiley.com/

Chemistry Europe (formerly ChemPubSoc Europe) is an organization of 16 chemical societies from 15 European countries, representing over 75,000 chemists. It publishes a family of academic chemistry journals, covering a broad range of disciplines.

Chemistry Europe was founded on the initiative of the German Chemical Society in 1995. The first journal co-owned by Chemistry Europe was Chemistry: A European Journal (launched in 1995). In 1998, the European Journal of Inorganic Chemistry and European Journal of Organic Chemistry were created with the participation of six European chemical societies. Over the years, more societies merged their journals, bringing the total number of societies involved to 16 from 15 different countries (as of 2020).

The Chemistry Europe Fellows Program was established in 2015 (as the ChemPubSoc Europe Fellows Program) and is the highest award given by Chemistry Europe. The Fellowship is awarded based on the recipients' support as authors, advisors, guest editors, referees as well as services to their national chemical societies. New Fellows are announced every two years in the run-up to the biannual EuChemS Congress.

The Chemistry Europe Award recognizes outstanding contributions to chemistry. The inaugural Chemistry Europe Award was awarded in 2023 to Bert Weckhuysen, Professor at Utrecht University, The Netherlands, “for outstanding achievements and leadership in the field of sustainable chemistry and catalysis research”.

== Participating societies ==
The sixteen participating European chemical societies are:

- Gesellschaft Österreichischer Chemiker (GÖCH), Austria
- Société Royale de Chimie (SRC), Belgium
- Koninklijke Vlaamse Chemische Vereniging (KVCV), Belgium
- Česká společnost chemická (ČSCH), Czech Republic
- Société Chimique de France (SCF), France
- Gesellschaft Deutscher Chemiker (GDCh), Germany
- Association of Greek Chemists (EEX), Greece
- Magyar Kémikusok Egyesülete (MKE), Hungary
- Società Chimica Italiana (SCI), Italy
- Koninklijke Nederlandse Chemische Vereniging (KNCV), The Netherlands
- Polskie Towarzystwo Chemiczne (PTChem), Poland
- Sociedade Portuguesa de Química (SPQ), Portugal
- Slovenská Chemická Spoloćnosť (SCHS), Slovakia
- Real Sociedad Española de Química (RSEQ), Spain
- Svenska Kemistsamfundet (SK), Sweden
- Schweizerische Chemische Gesellschaft (SCG), Switzerland

== Journals ==
The journals are published by Wiley-VCH and include the titles: Chemistry: A European Journal, European Journal of Organic Chemistry, European Journal of Inorganic Chemistry, Chemistry—Methods, Batteries & Supercaps, ChemBioChem, ChemCatChem, ChemElectroChem, ChemMedChem, ChemPhotoChem, ChemPhysChem, ChemPlusChem, ChemSusChem, ChemSystemsChem, ChemistrySelect, ChemistryOpen, as well as the ChemistryViews online portal and science magazine.
