= Rubber and Plastics Research Association of Great Britain =

Glass research organisation in the UK

- Formation: 1 January 1961; 65 years ago.
- Location: Shawbury, UK.

The Rubber and Plastics Research Association of Great Britain (RAPRA) was a research organisation that worked to advance both technologies and techniques for the rubber and plastics sector.

== History ==
The foundations of what would become the Rubber and Plastics Research Association of Great Britain (RAPRA) were set out in 1960, by which point it had been observed that there was substantial overlap in the research projects being conducted by the then-separate research associations serving the rubber and plastics industries. No less than 70 members of the British Plastics Federation had pledged their support for RAPRA by 15 November 1960, at which point the articles for the prospective amalgamated association were adopted by the executive committee of the Research Association of British Rubber Manufacturers. That same month, it was decided that RAPRA would be based at the existing laboratories operated by the rubber industry at Shawbury, although the site would be promptly expanded via the construction of multiple additional buildings.

One persistent area of activity for RAPRA was its efforts to refine and develop breakthroughs in polymer technologies to produce commercially-viable products. The organisation was involved in multiple areas of research, including into the monitoring of air pollution, the flammability of plastic furniture, and the preparation of electrically-conductive rubber blends.

Starting in 1972, it was involved in the publishing of the Polymer Library, a searchable database of research on plastics, rubbers, polymeric composites, and adhesives. In 1986, the limited company Rapra Technology Ltd was incorporated.

In September 2002, RAPRA was subject to a management buyout; the restructuring of the organisation that took place around this transaction enabled it to acquire complementary businesses. Four years later, the Smithers Group acquired the organisation, after which it was renamed Smithers Rapra Technology Ltd. In 2010, RAPRA relocated to offices in Telford and implemented a network-based support model. In January 2017, it was announced that RAPRA had been acquired by the privately run peer group Made in the Midlands.
