= ChemMedChem =

- Discipline: Chemistry
- Language: English
- Edited by: David Peralta

Publication details
- History: 2006–present
- Publisher: Wiley-VCH on behalf of Chemistry Europe
- Frequency: Biweekly
- Open access: Hybrid
- Impact factor: 3.4 (2024)

Standard abbreviations
- ISO 4: ChemMedChem

Indexing
- CODEN: CHEMGX
- ISSN: 1860-7179 (print); 1860-7187 (web)
- LCCN: 2006243117
- OCLC no.: 62883316

Links
- Journal homepage; Online access; Online archive

ChemMedChem is a biweekly peer-reviewed scientific journal covering medicinal chemistry. It is published by Wiley-VCH on behalf of Chemistry Europe. In addition to original research in the form of full papers and shorter communications, the journal contains review-type articles (reviews, minireviews, patent reviews, essays, highlights) as well as occasional book reviews and conference reports.

Topics covered include drug design, development and delivery, molecular modeling, combinatorial chemistry, drug target validation, lead generation, ADMET studies, and, as of 2017, nanomedicine (including targeted drug delivery, theranostics, and nanodrugs).

The first volume was published at the beginning of 2006 under the two founding chemical societies, the German Chemical Society and the Italian Chemical Society.

According to the Journal Citation Reports, the journal has a 2024 impact factor of 3.4.
