= Jürgen P. Rabe =

German physicist

Jürgen P. Rabe is a German physicist and nanoscientist.

== Life ==
Jürgen P. Rabe studied physics and mathematics at RWTH Aachen where in 1981 he obtained his diploma in physics, based on a thesis on semiconductor optics with Peter Grosse. 1984 he obtained his doctoral degree from the Department of Physics at the Technical University of Munich, based on a biophysical thesis on model membranes, promoted by Erich Sackmann.

As a visiting scientist at the IBM Almaden Research Center in San José (1984–1986) he initiated the use of scanning tunneling microscopy for molecular monolayers, which he continued in Gerhard Wegner's department at the Max Planck Institute for Polymer Research.

In 1992, he obtained his habilitation on this topic and became a professor for physical chemistry at Johannes Gutenberg-Universität in Mainz. Since 1994 Rabe is full professor for experimental physics with an emphasis on macromolecular and supramolecular systems at the Department of Physics at the Humboldt-Universität zu Berlin. Rabe is an elected scientific member of the Max Planck Society and external member of the Max Planck Institute of Colloids and Interfaces in Potsdam-Golm as well as founding director of the Integrative Research Institute for the Sciences IRIS Adlershof of Humboldt-Universität. He was visiting professor at the Materials Department of ETH Zürich and for the Department of Chemistry at Princeton University.

Jürgen P. Rabe is the brother of Klaus F. Rabe and cousin of Sophia Rabe-Hesketh and the economist Birgitta Rabe.

== Research ==
Rabe became internationally known for his seminal scanning tunneling microscopy research on the structure, dynamics, and electronic properties of self-assembled molecular systems at solid-liquid interfaces. He developed concepts for a workbench to manipulate individual macromolecules and supramolecular systems, employing scanning probe microscopies, light, and molecularly modified graphite surfaces, which has been used to correlate structure and dynamics of molecular systems with mechanical, electronic, optical, and (bio)chemical properties from molecular to macromolecular lengths and time scales. It also led to the development of prototypical quasi 1- and 2-dimensional organic-inorganic hybrid systems, based on opto-electronically active molecular or graphene-based nanopores. In collaborative and interdisciplinary projects Rabe contributed to the development of advanced functional materials, including dendronized and conjugated polymers, multivalent biopolymer complexes, ultrathin films of conjugated molecules, supramolecular polymers and helical nanofilaments, nanographenes, and 2D materials as well as mixed 2D/3D heterostructures.
