= Nanoscale (journal) =

- Discipline: Nanoscience, nanotechnology
- Language: English
- Edited by: Chunli Bai and Dirk Guldi

Publication details
- History: 2009-present
- Publisher: Royal Society of Chemistry
- Frequency: Biweekly
- Impact factor: 8.307 (2021)

Standard abbreviations
- ISO 4: Nanoscale

Indexing
- CODEN: NANOHL
- ISSN: 2040-3372
- OCLC no.: 775278360

Links
- Journal homepage

Nanoscale is a peer-reviewed scientific journal covering experimental and theoretical research in all areas of nanotechnology and nanoscience. It is published by the Royal Society of Chemistry. According to the Journal Citation Reports, the journal has a 2021 impact factor of 8.307. Its own website states that its 2024 impact factor was 5.1.

The journal operates under the hybrid open-access model, which means authors may choose to publish under the subscription mode without a charge, or publish open-access after paying an article processing charge (APC). According to journal metrics maintained by the Royal Society of Chemistry, the journal recorded over 5500 article submissions in 2025, and published just over 2000.

== Abstracting and Indexing ==
The journal is indexed in the following services and databases:

- IET INSPEC
- EI Compendex
- Web of Science: Science Citation Index Expanded (SCIE)
- Scopus
- PubMed Central
