= Advanced Engineering Materials =

Journal of material science

- Discipline: Materials Science
- Language: English
- Edited by: Dr. Sandra Kalveram

Publication details
- History: 1999–present
- Publisher: Wiley-VCH (Germany)
- Frequency: Monthly
- Impact factor: 4.122 (2021)

Standard abbreviations
- ISO 4: Adv. Eng. Mater.

Indexing
- ISSN: 1438-1656 (print); 1527-2648 (web)

Links
- Journal homepage; Advanced Engineering Materials News Service

Advanced Engineering Materials is a peer-reviewed materials science journal that publishes monthly. Advanced Engineering Materials publishes peer-reviewed reviews, communications, and full papers, on topics centered around structural materials, such as metals, alloys, ceramics, composites, polymers etc..

== Abstracting and indexing ==
Thomson Reuters

- Current Contents / Engineering, Computing & Technology
- Journal Citation Reports
- Materials Science Citation Index
- Science Citation Index Expanded

Elsevier

- Compendex
- SCOPUS

CSA Illumina

- Advanced Polymer Abstracts
- Ceramic Abstracts
- Civil Engineering Abstracts
- Computer & Information Systems Abstracts
- Computer Information & Technology Abstracts
- Earthquake Engineering Abstracts
- Mechanical & Transportation Engineering Abstracts
- Technology Research Database
- Engineered Materials Abstracts
- International Aerospace Abstracts
- Materials Business File
- METADEX

Other databases

- Chemical Abstracts Service - SciFinder
- PASCAL database
- FIZ Karlsruhe
- INSPEC
- Polymer Library

== See also ==
- Advanced Materials
