= ChemPhysChem =

- Discipline: Physical chemistry
- Language: English
- Edited by: Kira Welter

Publication details
- History: 2000–present
- Publisher: Wiley-VCH on behalf of Chemistry Europe
- Frequency: Biweekly
- Open access: Hybrid
- Impact factor: 3.520 (2021)

Standard abbreviations
- ISO 4: ChemPhysChem

Indexing
- CODEN: CPCHFT
- ISSN: 1439-4235 (print); 1439-7641 (web)
- LCCN: 00256045
- OCLC no.: 45745048

Links
- Journal homepage; Online access; Online archive

ChemPhysChem is a biweekly peer-reviewed scientific journal published by Wiley-VCH on behalf of Chemistry Europe. It was established in 2000 and covers all aspects of chemical physics and physical chemistry. Initially published monthly, the journal moved to 18 issues per year in 2007, and further to biweekly in 2016.

== Abstracting and indexing ==
The journal is abstracted and indexed by:

- Cambridge Structural Database
- Chemical Abstracts Service
- Current Contents/Physical, Chemical & Earth Sciences
- Index Medicus/MEDLINE/PubMed
- Inspec
- PASCAL
- Science Citation Index Expanded
- Scopus
- VINITI Database RAS

According to the Journal Citation Reports, the journal has a 2021 impact factor of 3.520.
