= ACS Sustainable Chemistry & Engineering =

Biweekly peer-reviewed scientific journal

- Discipline: sustainability, green engineering, green chemistry
- Language: English
- Edited by: Peter Licence

Publication details
- History: 2013–present
- Publisher: American Chemical Society (United States)
- Frequency: Weekly
- Impact factor: 7.1 (2023)

Standard abbreviations
- ISO 4: ACS Sustain. Chem. Eng.

Indexing
- ISSN: 2168-0485

Links
- Journal homepage

ACS Sustainable Chemistry & Engineering is a weekly peer-reviewed scientific journal published by the American Chemical Society. It covers research in green chemistry, green engineering, biomass, alternative energy, and life cycle assessment. According to Journal Citation Reports, the journal has an impact factor of 7.1 in 2023. In 2023 Peter Licence (The University of Nottingham, UK) was appointed Editor-in-Chief.

== Article types ==
The journal invites letters, articles, features, and perspectives (reviews) that address challenges of sustainability in the chemical enterprise and advance principles of green chemistry and green engineering.
