= Journal of Cardiovascular Pharmacology and Therapeutics =

- Discipline: Cardiology
- Language: English
- Edited by: Josip A. Borovac, MD, PhD

Publication details
- History: 1996-present
- Publisher: SAGE Publications
- Frequency: Bi-monthly
- Impact factor: 2.8 (2024)

Standard abbreviations
- ISO 4: J. Cardiovasc. Pharmacol. Ther.

Indexing
- ISSN: 1074-2484 (print); 1940-4034 (web)
- LCCN: 2004700018
- OCLC no.: 29631130

Links
- Journal homepage; Online access; Online archive

Journal of Cardiovascular Pharmacology and Therapeutics is a quarterly peer-reviewed medical journal that covers cardiology. The editor-in-chief is Josip A. Borovac, MD, PhD (University of Split School of Medicine) and the founding editor is Bramah N. Singh (University of California, Los Angeles). It was established in 1996 and is published by SAGE Publications.

== Abstracting and indexing ==
The journal is abstracted and indexed in Scopus and the Science Citation Index Expanded. According to the Journal Citation Reports, its 2024 impact factor is 2.8, ranking it 189 out of 353 journals in the category "Pharmacology & Pharmacy” and 96 out of 231 journals in the category "Cardiac and Cardiovascular Systems”.

The full list of abstracting and indexing database that the journal is part of is the following:CINAHL, Clarivate Analytics: BIOSIS Previews, Clarivate Analytics: Biological Abstracts, Clarivate Analytics: Science Citation Index Expanded (SCIE), Directory of Open Access Journals (DOAJ), EMBASE/Excerpta Medica, Ovid: Allied and Complementary Medicine Database, ProQuest, Prous Science Integrity®, PubMed: MEDLINE, SciSearch, Science Citation Index Expanded (Web of Science), SCOPUS.

The journal is a member of the Committee on Publication Ethics (COPE).

== Aims and scope ==
Journal of Cardiovascular Pharmacology and Therapeutics is an open access, peer-reviewed journal dedicated to advancing drug-, biologic-, and device-based therapies for cardiovascular disease across the translational spectrum. We publish high-quality preclinical, translational, and clinical research—including mechanistic studies, PK/PD analyses, dose-finding work, clinical trials (Phase I–IV), registry studies, and real-world evidence—alongside authoritative reviews and meta-analyses.

JCPT particularly welcomes research at the interface of pharmacology and devices, such as drug–device combinations, interventional and structural heart therapies, and implantable, wearable, and digital technologies that guide or deliver treatment. Diseases of interest include coronary syndromes, heart failure, arrhythmias, thrombosis, valvular and structural disease, pulmonary hypertension, vascular disease, stroke prevention, cardiomyopathies, and cardio-oncologic/metabolic complications.

The journal is committed to methodological rigor, transparency, and global representation, encouraging multidisciplinary submissions that integrate pharmacology, interventional cardiology, electrophysiology, imaging, systems biology, data science, and health services research to accelerate safe and effective therapeutic innovation.
