= EuroTech Universities Alliance =

Collaboration of research universities

EuroTech Universities Alliance is an alliance of Technical University of Denmark, École polytechnique fédérale de Lausanne, Institut Polytechnique de Paris, Technion – Israel Institute of Technology, Eindhoven University of Technology, and Technical University of Munich. Founded in 2011, it aims to promote collaboration in research, education and innovation between European universities of science and technology. Today, the alliance focuses on five fields: artificial intelligence, additive manufacturing, health and bioengineering, sustainability (including energy, climate, environment, and circular economy), and entrepreneurship and innovation. The current president of the alliance is Robert-Jan Smits (Eindhoven University of Technology).

== History ==
In 2006, Technical University of Munich and Technical University of Denmark established a strategic collaboration framework to strengthen bottom-up joint activities. Eindhoven University of Technology joined this partnership two years later. When École polytechnique fédérale de Lausanne followed in 2011, the EuroTech Universities Alliance was officially founded. École Polytechnique joined the alliance in 2018 and Technion – Israel Institute of Technology in 2019. In 2024, Institut Polytechnique de Paris replaced École Polytechnique as a member. Since 2012, the alliance has had an office in Brussels. From 2014 to 2019, EuroTech Universities published the popular science magazine Technologist.

== Strategic projects ==
In 2018 and 2020, the alliance launched two large programmes for postdoctoral researchers. Both programmes have been co-funded by the European Commission. In 2020, EuroTech Universities Alliance, together with Czech Technical University in Prague and Tallinn University of Technology launched the EuroTeQ Engineering University, which is part of the European Commission's European Universities Initiative. In 2023, HEC Paris and IESE Business School joined the initiative.
