= ChemSusChem =

- Discipline: Sustainable chemistry
- Language: English
- Edited by: Leana Travaglini

Publication details
- History: 2008–present
- Publisher: Wiley-VCH on behalf of Chemistry Europe
- Frequency: Biweekly
- Open access: Hybrid
- Impact factor: 6.6 (2024)

Standard abbreviations
- ISO 4: ChemSusChem

Indexing
- CODEN: CHEMIZ
- ISSN: 1864-5631 (print); 1864-564X (web)
- LCCN: 2008254268
- OCLC no.: 441722712

Links
- Journal homepage; Online access; Online archive

ChemSusChem is a biweekly peer-reviewed scientific journal established in 2008 and published by Wiley-VCH on behalf of Chemistry Europe. The editor-in-chief is Leana Travaglini. The journal covers research at the interface of chemistry and sustainability, including contributions from materials science, chemical engineering, and biotechnology. It publishes full papers, communications, reviews, concepts, highlights, and viewpoints.

According to the Journal Citation Reports, the journal has a 2024 impact factor of 6.6.
