= Polymer Library =

The Polymer Library, formerly Rapra Abstracts, is a searchable database of research on plastics, rubbers, polymeric composites, and adhesives. It includes abstracts from over 450 journals, as well as company literature, data sheets, and patents. The index covers end-use applications and commercial and legal implications, as well as basic research for academic and corporate scientists. The Library is aggregated by EBSCO, ProQuest, and STN.

Its literature coverage goes back to 1972. It was originally published by RAPRA, formerly the Rubber and Plastics Research Association of Great Britain, and was published by Smithers Information Ltd. until June 2018. As off August 2018 the publication is continued by WTI-Frankfurt-digital GmbH i.G..
