= Chemistry: A European Journal =

- Discipline: Chemistry
- Language: English
- Edited by: Haymo Ross

Publication details
- History: 1995–present
- Publisher: Wiley-VCH on behalf of Chemistry Europe
- Frequency: Weekly
- Impact factor: 3.6 (2025)

Standard abbreviations
- ISO 4: Chem. Eur. J.
- NLM: Chemistry

Indexing
- CODEN: CEUJED
- ISSN: 0947-6539 (print); 1521-3765 (web)
- LCCN: sn95026440
- OCLC no.: 32677914

Links
- Journal homepage; Online access; Online archive

Chemistry: A European Journal is a weekly peer-reviewed scientific journal that covers all areas of chemistry and related fields. It is published by Wiley-VCH on behalf of Chemistry Europe. The editor-in-chief is Haymo Ross.

According to the Journal Citation Reports, the journal has a 2025 impact factor of 3.6.
