= Peter R. Kowey =

American cardiologist and medical researcher

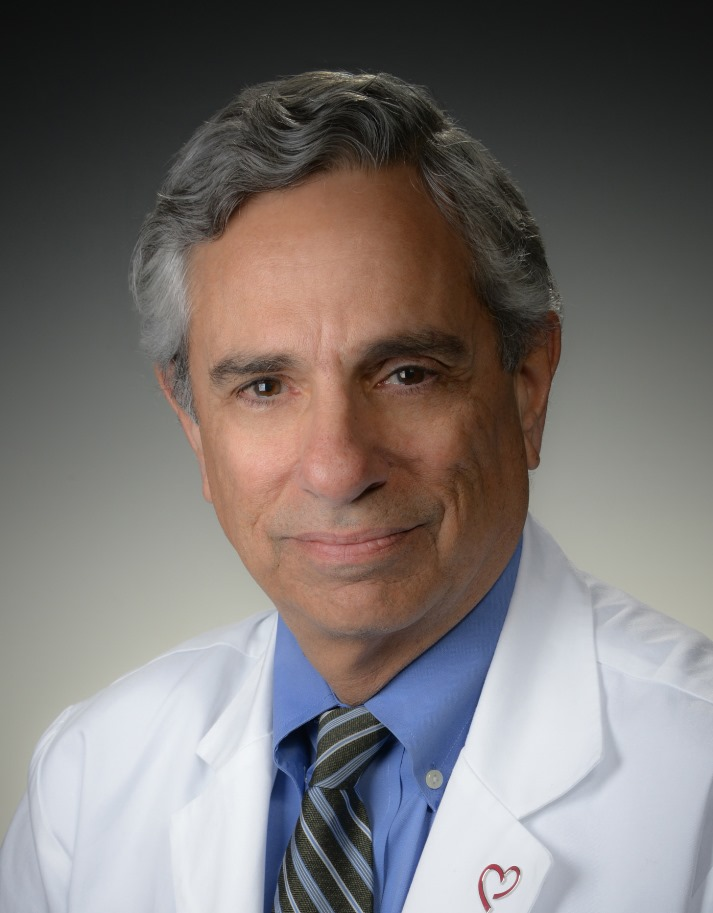
- Education: University of Pennsylvania (MD); Saint Joseph's College (University) (BS)
- Scientific career
- Fields: Cardiology, Arrhythmias, Cardiovascular Disease
- Workplaces: Lankenau Medical Center; Lankenau Institute for Medical Research; Main Line Health; Jefferson Medical College; Medical College of Pennsylvania

Peter R. Kowey is an American cardiologist and medical researcher. He is Professor of Medicine and Clinical Pharmacology at Jefferson Medical College of Thomas Jefferson University and holds the William Wikoff Smith Chair in Cardiovascular Research at Lankenau Institute for Medical Research.

== Early life and education ==
He graduated from Saint Joseph’s College (now Saint Joseph’s University) in 1971 with a B.S. in biology and from medical school at the University of Pennsylvania in 1975; he was an intern and resident at Penn State Milton S. Hershey Medical Center from 1975 and 1978. He held a fellowship in cardiology at Harvard School of Public Health and Peter Bent Brigham Hospital from 1978 to 1980, and a fellowship in cardiovascular medicine at the West Roxbury Veterans Administration Hospital and Harvard Medical School from 1980 to 1981.

== Career ==
Kowey is a fellow of the Clinical Council of the American Heart Association, the American College of Cardiology, the American College of Physicians, the College of Physicians of Philadelphia, the American College of Chest Physicians, and the American College of Clinical Pharmacology. Kowey has been a consultant to the United States Food and Drug Administration.

== Selected publications ==
He has edited or co-edited three peer-reviewed journal supplements and several books, including “Cardiac Arrhythmia: Mechanisms, Diagnosis, and Management” (2001); “Clinical Management of Atrial Fibrillation” (2015); and “Cardiac Arrhythmias, Pacing and Sudden Death” (2017).

His most-cited publications include:

- Singh BN, Hohnloser SH, Connolly SJ, Crijns Hgjm, Roy D, Kowey PR, ACapucci, Radzik D, Investigators Adonis (2007). "Dronedarone for maintenance of sinus rhythm in atrial fibrillation or flutter". New England Journal of Medicine. 357 (10): 987–9. doi:10.1056/NEJMoa054686. hdl:11566/54713. PMID 17804843.
- Kowey PR, Eisenberg R, Engel TR (1984). “Electrophysiological Testing for Sustained Arrhythmias in Patients with Hypertrophic Obstructive Cardiomyopathy”. N Engl J Med; 310 (24):1566-9.
- Rutherford JD; Pfeffer MA; Moyé LA; Davis BR; Flaker GC; Kowey PR; Lamas GA; Miller HS; Packer M; Rouleau JL (1994). "Effects of captopril on ischemic events after myocardial infarction. Results of the Survival and Ventricular Enlargement trial. SAVE Investigators". Circulation. 90 (4): 1731–8. doi:10.1161/01.cir.90.4.1731. PMID 7923656..
- Medina-Ravell VA, Lankipalli RS, Yan G-X, Antzelevitch C, Medina-Malpica NA, Medina-Malpica OA, Droogan C, Kowey PR (2003). "Effect of epicardial or biventricular pacing to prolong QT interval and increase transmural dispersion of repolarization". Circulation. 107 (5): 740–6. doi:10.1161/01.cir.0000048126.07819.37. PMID 12578878.
- Yan GX, Lankipalli RS, Burke JF, Musco S, Kowey PR (2003). "Ventricular repolarization components on the electrocardiogram: cellular basis and clinical significance". J Am Coll Cardiol. 42 (3): 401–9. doi:10.1016/s0735-1097(03)00713-7. PMID 12906963.
- Kowey PR, Reiffel JA, Ellenbogen KA, Naccarelli GV, Pratt CM (2010). “Efficacy and Safety of Prescription Omega-3 Fatty Acids for the Prevention of Symptomatic Atrial Fibrillation”. JAMA; 304 (21): 2363–72.
- Kowey PR and Robinson V (2020). “The Relentless Pursuit of New Drugs to Treat Cardiac Arrhythmias”. Circulation; 141 (19): 1507–9.

Around 2005 he started writing medical murder mysteries, in which the protagonist is named Philip Sarkis.

== Awards ==
- Medical Clerkship, Oxford University
- Bradley and Shaffrey Awards, St. Joseph’s University
- Edward S. Cooper Award, American Heart Association
