= Angewandte Chemie =

- Discipline: Chemistry
- Language: English, German
- Edited by: Neville Compton

Publication details
- History: 1887–present
- Publisher: Wiley-VCH
- Frequency: Weekly
- Impact factor: 16.9 (2024)

Standard abbreviations
- ISO 4: Angew. Chem.

Indexing
- CODEN: ACIEF5
- ISSN: 1433-7851 (print); 1521-3773 (web)

Links
- German edition; English edition

Angewandte Chemie (German pronunciation: [ˈaŋɡəˌvantə çeˈmiː], meaning "Applied Chemistry") is a weekly peer-reviewed scientific journal that is published by Wiley-VCH on behalf of the German Chemical Society (Gesellschaft Deutscher Chemiker). Publishing formats include feature-length reviews, short highlights, research communications, minireviews, essays, book reviews, meeting reviews, correspondences, corrections, and obituaries. This journal contains review articles covering all aspects of chemistry. According to the Journal Citation Reports, the journal had a 2023 impact factor of 16.1.

== Editions ==
The journal appears in two editions with separate volume and page numbering: a German edition, Angewandte Chemie, and a fully English-language edition, Angewandte Chemie International Edition. The editions are identical in content with the exception of occasional reviews of German-language books or German translations of IUPAC recommendations.

== Publication history ==
In 1887, Ferdinand Fischer established the Zeitschrift für die Chemische Industrie (Journal for the Chemical Industry). In 1888, the title was changed to Zeitschrift für Angewandte Chemie (Journal of Applied Chemistry), and volume numbering started over. This title was kept until the end of 1941 when it was changed to Die Chemie. Until 1920, the journal was published by Springer Verlag and by Verlag Chemie starting in 1921. Due to World War II, the journal did not publish from April 1945 to December 1946. In 1947, publication was resumed under the current title, Angewandte Chemie.

In 1962, the English-language edition was launched as Angewandte Chemie International Edition in English, which has a separate volume counting. With the beginning of Vol. 37 (1998) "in English" was dropped from the journal name.

Several journals have merged into Angewandte Chemie, including Chemische Technik/Chemische Apparatur in 1947 and Zeitschrift für Chemie in 1990.

In 2025, Angewandte Chemie Novit was launched, to publish the "most exceptional articles" that were accepted for publication in Angewante Chemie.

== 2020 controversy ==
In June 2020, the journal withdrew a paper by Tomas Hudlicky (Brock University), "Organic synthesis—Where now?" is thirty years old. A reflection on the current state of affairs, stating that it was "accepted after peer review and appears as an accepted article online prior to editing, proofing, and formal publication of the final Version of Record". The paper drew backlash for criticizing the alleged "preferential status" of women and minorities in chemistry.

The journal withdrew the paper within hours, stating that the "paper contains opinions that don't reflect our values and has been removed. [...] Something went very wrong here and we're committed to do better." Additionally, 16 members of the journal's advisory board resigned on 8 June. On the same day it was reported that two editors had been suspended for passing the article. As a consequence, shaping of a new version of the journal begun, with diversity, equity, and inclusion, transparency, and a continued commitment to scientific excellence as the guiding principles. A new editorial team was formed additionally.

Hudlicky responded to the backlash and retraction stating "I stand by the views I wished to express in the essay, some of which are common knowledge, while others were duly cited from primary and secondary sources". Following a condemnation by Brock University's former vice-president, he was defended by the Canadian Association of University Teachers and Brock University Faculty Association. Subsequently, he edited and republished the article on his own website.

== Impact factor ==
While it has been suggested that the journal's impact factor is as high as it is in comparison to other chemistry journals because the journal contains reviews, the editors claim this effect is too small to explain the difference or affect the ranking of the journal in its subject group.
