= Wiley-VCH =

Academic publisher (founded 1921)

- Parent company: John Wiley & Sons
- Founded: 1921
- Founder: German Chemical Society
- Country of origin: Germany
- Headquarters location: Weinheim
- Publication types: Academic journals, books
- Official website: www.wiley-vch.de

Wiley-VCH is a German publisher owned by John Wiley & Sons. It was founded in 1921 as Verlag Chemie (meaning "Chemistry Press": VCH stands for Verlag Chemie) by two German learned societies. Later, it was merged into the German Chemical Society (GDCh). In 1991, VCH acquired Akademie Verlag. It has been owned by John Wiley & Sons since 1996. The humanities section of Akademie Verlag and the Akademie brand were sold in 1997 to R. Oldenbourg Verlag, while VCH retained the natural sciences catalog.
