= Adolf Lieben =

Austrian chemist

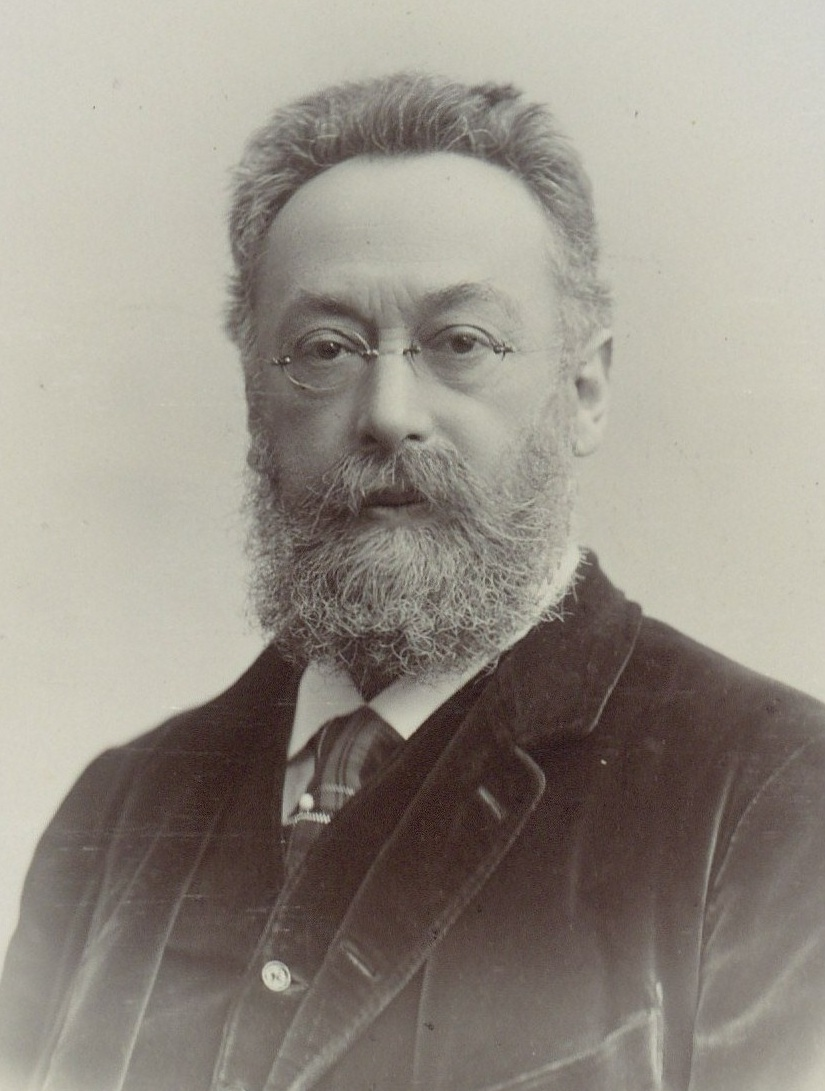
- Adolf Lieben
- Born: 3 December 1836; Vienna, Austrian Empire
- Died: 6 June 1914 (aged 77); Vienna, Austria-Hungary
- Education: University of Heidelberg
- Scientific career
- Workplaces: University of Vienna, University of Palermo, University of Turin, University of Prague
- Doctoral advisor: Robert Wilhelm Bunsen
- Doctoral students: Carl Auer von Welsbach

Adolf Lieben (3 December 1836 – 6 June 1914) was an Austrian-Jewish chemist. He was born in Vienna the son of Ignatz Lieben. He studied at the University of Vienna, University of Heidelberg (Ph.D. 1856 with Robert Wilhelm Bunsen), and Paris, and subsequently held the positions of privat-docent at the University of Vienna (1861), and professor in the universities of Palermo (1863), Turin (1867), and Prague (1871). From 1875 until his death he held the chair of general and pharmacological chemistry at the University of Vienna, and was a member of the Vienna Academy of Sciences.

== Publications ==
Lieben has published many essays in Liebig's Annalen der Chemie:

- "Ueber die Einwirkung schwacher Affinitäten auf Aldehyde," 1861;
- "Ueber das Iodbenzol," 1869;
- "Ueber festes Benzoylchlorid," 1875; etc.,
- "Sitzungsberichte den Kaiserlichen Akademie der Wissenschaften in Wien" ("Untersuchungen über Milchzucker," "Einwirkung von Cyangas auf Aldehyde," "Ueber den Formaldehyd und dessen Umwandlung in Methylalkohl," "Reduction des Exotonchlorals," etc.),
- "Monatshefte für Chemie,"
- "Comptes-Rendus de l'Académie de Paris,"
- "Berichte der Deutschen Chemischen Gesellschaft, Berlin,"
- "Gazzetta Chimica Italiana, Palermo," etc.

== See also ==
- Lieben haloform reaction
- Hunsdiecker reaction
