= Robert Schiff =

German-born Italian chemist (1854–1940)

Robert Schiff (July 25, 1854 in Frankfurt am Main, Germany – 1940 in Massa, Italy) was a German-born, Italian chemist.

He was the son of physiologist Moritz Schiff and Claudia Trier. He successively was a student at the University of Heidelberg, then at the University of Zürich, where he obtained a doctorate in 1876. He then became an assistant to Stanislao Cannizzaro at Sapienza University of Rome, and in 1879 was appointed professor of chemistry at the University of Modena. In 1892 he relocated as a professor to the University of Pisa.

He conducted studies on the condensation of aldehydes with ammonia as well as research of heterocyclic compounds. He was also interested in Schiff bases, described by his uncle Hugo Schiff.

He published scientific articles in the Gazzetta Chimica Italiana, in the Berichte der Deutschen Chemischen Gesellschaft, in Justus Liebig’s Annalen der Chemie, in Accademia dei Lincei and in the Zeitschrift für Physikalische Chemie.
