= Anales de Química =

- Discipline: Chemistry
- Language: Spanish

Publication details
- History: 1903–1998
- Publisher: Real Sociedad Española de Química (Spain)

Standard abbreviations
- ISO 4: An. Quím.

Indexing
- CODEN: ANQUEX
- ISSN: 1130-2283
- OCLC no.: 802697545

The Anales de Química was a peer-review scientific journal in the field of chemistry. The first issue was published in 1903 by the Real Sociedad Española de Física y Química (later the Real Sociedad Española de Química, the Spanish Royal Society of Chemistry). Its publication ended in 1998.

It should not be mistaken with a prior journal from the 19th century, Anales de química, monitor de química y farmacia.

== History ==
The Anales des Quimica were published in the following order:

- Anales de la Real Sociedad Española de Física y Química, 1903 (vol. 1) to 1940 (vol. 36; ISSN 0365-6675, CODEN: ASEFAR)
- Anales de Física y Química, 1941 (vol 37) to 1947 (vol. 43; ISSN 0365-2351, CODEN: AFQMAH)

In 1948 (vol. 44), the journal was split into two sections:

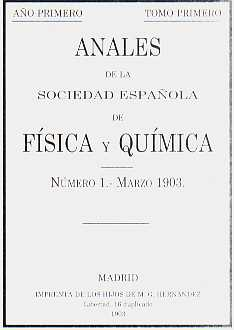
- Cover of the first issue of the scientific journal Anales de Quimica. March, 1903.
  Anales de la Real Sociedad Española de Física y Química/Ser. A, Física, 1948 (vol. 44) to 1967 (vol. 63; ISSN 0034-0871, CODEN: ARSFAM)
- Anales de la Real Sociedad Española de Física y Química/Ser. B, Química, 1948 (vol. 44) to 1967 (vol. 63; ISSN 0034-088X, CODEN ARSQAL)

Section A subsequently became the Anales de Física. From 1968, section B was continued as the Anales de Quimica (1968, vol 64, to 1979, vol. 75; ISSN 0365-4990, CODEN: ANQUBU).

From 1980 (vol. 76) to 1989 (vol. 85) this title was again split in three sections:

- Anales de Química/Serie A, Química Física y Ingenieria Química (ISSN 0211-1330, CODEN: AQSTDQ)
- Anales de Química/Serie B, Química Inorgánica y Química Analítica (ISSN 0211-1349, CODEN: AQSAD3)
- Anales de Química/Serie C, Química Orgánica y Bioquímica (ISSN 0211-1357, CODEN: AQSBD6)

From 1990 (vol. 86) until 1995 (vol. 91), sections A to C were merged again, returning Anales de Química (1990, vol 86, to 1995, vol. 91; ISSN 1130-2283, CODEN: ANQUEX).

Finally, the journal was renamed to Anales de Química, International Edition (1996, vol. 92, to 1998, vol. 94; (ISSN 1130-2283, CODEN: AQIEFZ) until it was merged in 1998 to form the European Journal of Organic Chemistry and the European Journal of Inorganic Chemistry.

== Legacy ==
To continue the tradition of Anales de Química, the Spanish Royal Society of Chemistry established a new journal in 1999, the Anales de la Real Sociedad Española de Química.

== See also ==
- Chemische Berichte
- Bulletin des Sociétés Chimiques Belges
- Bulletin de la Société Chimique de France
- European Journal of Inorganic Chemistry
- European Journal of Organic Chemistry
- Gazzetta Chimica Italiana
- Liebigs Annalen
- Recueil des Travaux Chimiques des Pays-Bas
- Chimika Chronika
- Revista Portuguesa de Química
- ACH—Models in Chemistry
