= Bulletin de la Société Chimique de France =

- Discipline: Chemistry
- Language: French

Publication details
- Former name: Bulletin de la Société Chimique de Paris
- History: 1858–1997
- Publisher: Société Chimique de France (France)

Standard abbreviations
- ISO 4: Bull. Soc. Chim. Fr.

Indexing
- CODEN: BSCFAS
- ISSN: 0037-8968

The Bulletin de la Société Chimique de France was a French peer-reviewed scientific journal on chemistry published by the Société Chimique de France. It was established in 1858 under the title Bulletin de la Société Chimique de Paris (ISSN 0991-6504), under which additional name it appeared until the end of series 3.

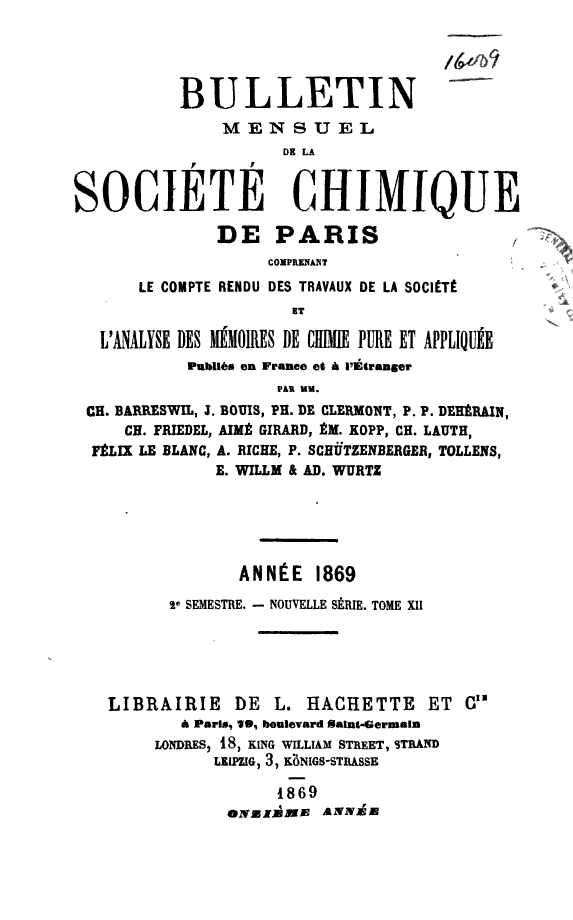
An 1869 volume of the "Bulletin"

The journal was published in several series:

- Bulletin de la Société Chimique de France (ISSN 0037-8968), Vol. 1 (1858) – Vol. 6 (1863) (= 1. Ser.).
- Bulletin de la Société Chimique de France, N.S. (= 2e Ser., Vol. 1 (1864) – Vol. 50 (1888), (ISSN 0037-8968).
- Bulletin de la Société Chimique de France, 3e Ser., Vol. 1 (1889) – Vol. 36 (1906), (ISSN 0037-8968).
- Bulletin de la Société Chimique de France, 4e Ser., Vol. 1 (1907) – Vol. 54 (1933).

The fourth series of this journal was published as:

- Bulletin de la Société Chimique de France, 4e Ser, Analyse des travaux étrangers, Vol. 1 (1907) - Vol. 28 (1920), (ISSN 0150-9888).
- Bulletin de la Société Chimique de France, 4e Ser., Analyse des travaux français et étrangers, Vol. 29 (1921) - Vol. 54 (1933), (ISSN 0370-8985).

With the beginning of the fifth series, the journal was renamed as:

- Bulletin de la Société Chimique de France, Mémoires, (= 5. Sér.), Vol. 1 (1934) – Vol. 12 (1945), (ISSN 0366-3132, CODEN BSCDAM),
- Bulletin de la Société Chimique de France, Documentation, Vol. 1 (1933) - Vol. 12 (1946), (ISSN 0366-3116), CODEN BSCDAM).

After World War II, the titles were merged and published as:

- Bulletin de la Société Chimique de France, Vol. 13 (1946) – Vol. 134 (1997), (ISSN 0037-8968, CODEN BSCFAS).

The title was split in two parts from 1973–1984:

- Bulletin de la Société Chimique de France : Partie 1, Chimie analytique, chimie minérale, physicochimie (ISSN 0037-8968)
- Bulletin de la Société Chimique de France : Partie 2, Chimie moléculaire, organique et biologique (ISSN 0037-8968)

In 1985 the two parts were merged again until 1997 as:

- Bulletin de la Société Chimique de France (ISSN 0037-8968).

In 1998 the journal was absorbed by the European Journal of Organic Chemistry and the European Journal of Inorganic Chemistry.

== See also ==
- Anales de Química
- Chemische Berichte
- Bulletin des Sociétés Chimiques Belges
- European Journal of Organic Chemistry
- European Journal of Inorganic Chemistry
- Gazzetta Chimica Italiana
- Liebigs Annalen
- Recueil des Travaux Chimiques des Pays-Bas
- Chimika Chronika
- Revista Portuguesa de Química
- ACH—Models in Chemistry
