= Society of Spanish Researchers in the United Kingdom =

Society of Spanish Researchers in the United Kingdom (SRUK/CERU)
- Formation: 16 July 2012
- Type: Non-profit organisation
- Headquarters: United Kingdom
- Website: www.sruk.org.uk

The Society of Spanish Researchers in the United Kingdom (SRUK/CERU, including the acronym in Spanish, Científicos Españoles en el Reino Unido) is an independent, non-profit organization without any political affiliation, created in July 2011 and formally established in June 2012.

SRUK/CERU was created to promote networking among the Spanish researchers working in the United Kingdom, make science and technology more accessible to the general public and establish collaborations between this community and public and private organisations related to R&D, both in Spain and in the United Kingdom.

It currently has over 700 members from a vast range of disciplines. Thousands follow SRUK/CERU on Twitter and Facebook.

== Objectives ==
SRUK/CERU focuses mainly on these four important aspects, which define the core of the society:

- Social Network: creating a social network of Spanish researchers and students working in the United Kingdom. SRUK/CERU aims to facilitate the arrival of new members, by offering them advice and sharing valuable professional and personal experiences.
- Science Communicators: Increasing social awareness of Research and Development (R&D) and promoting a scientific culture in both British and Spanish societies. SRUK/CERU bridges the existing gap between scientists and the general public by holding multidisciplinary seminars, roundtables, conferences and an annual symposium.
- Science Representatives: representing Spanish Researchers in the United Kingdom to British and Spanish organizations, society and the media. SRUK/CERU also aims to serve as scientific advisor for both public and private organisms, sharing the professional knowledge and experience gained over the years.
- Scientific Mediators: facilitating interactions between private and public British and Spanish R&D institutions and researchers. We believe that exploring and establishing collaborations between the UK and Spain will be highly beneficial for all parts involved in the long run.

== History ==
SRUK/CERU was created in 2011 in an attempt to gather the group of Spanish researchers in the United Kingdom. In June of that year, Dr. Lorenzo Melchor, founding president of SRUK/CERU, represented this initial group of researchers in a meeting with Fidel López Álvarez, minister of the Office of Cultural and Scientific Affairs in the Spanish Embassy in the United Kingdom. During this meeting, Dr. Melchor received full support from the Embassy for any initiative aimed to bring together and give voice to this community of researchers. Right afterwards, the SRUK/CERU Facebook profile became public, and so the coordination of all the Spanish researchers wishing to get involved in the project. After several informal meetings, these researchers celebrated the first official meeting on 6th July 2016, where the objectives and working principles of the future Society were discussed, taking the existing Society of Portuguese Researchers, PARSUK, as a model.

During the following months, various informal gatherings (also called "Science Beers"), seminars and meetings organised by the newly formed working groups were held to shape SRUK/CERU's byelaws. On 16 June 2012, the founding assembly was held in the Luis Vives Hall of the Spanish Embassy in London. The rules and statutes were approved, as well as the official name of the society: Sociedad de Científicos Españoles en Reino Unido (CERU) in Spanish, which at that time was already beginning to acquire a certain reputation thanks to social networks, and Society of Spanish Researchers in the United Kingdom (SRUK) in English, incorporating the word "Researchers" which better defined the nature of the society.

SRUK/CERU began to grow in social networks, serving as a meeting point and source of information for Spanish researchers in the UK. The society also gradually gained reputation and contacts with various official organisations. In 2012, the London and Cambridge constituencies were established, followed shortly by the South-West in 2013, and thus the number of social and informative events increased, featuring collaborations with Native Scientist and the Spanish Institute Vicente Cañada Blanch's Science Week, among others. In addition, partnerships and agreements with other sponsoring institutions were initiated, like the Ramón Areces Foundation, SRUK/CERU's main sponsor since its origin, which powered the society's exponential growth.

During 2014, other constituencies (The Midlands, Oxford) were set up to develop new activities and local working groups where Spanish researchers were involved. It was in this year too that the first Travel Grants program was launched to support members attending conferences. Also, SRUK/CERU became a member of the Federation of Spanish Scientific Societies and collaborations were established with the British Spanish Society and the Network of Valencian Universities for the promotion of Research, Development and Innovation.

In 2015, three more constituencies were established (North-West, Scotland and Yorkshire) and numerous agreements were reached with other associations, research centres and institutions. In November, the scientific radio programme "En Fase Experimental" was launched, as a result of the collaboration with the radio station in Spanish Radio X London. In September of this year, SRUK/CERU published the "Report of Recommendations on R&D in Spain for the General Elections 2015" which was presented to the main Spanish political parties in order to provide advice on the problems and potential solutions for the researchers in Spain.

During 2016, several milestones in the history of SRUK/CERU were achieved: 500 members and 4,000 followers on Facebook, a framework agreement with the Spanish Foundation for Science and Technology (FECYT) for collaboration in activities of common interest; with the Banco Santander Foundation to create the Emerging Talent Award; and with NIMGenetics, the first collaboration with a private company. In addition, the blog "1, 2, 3 ... Explore!" was launched, with informative articles on SRUK/CERU research and the mentoring program. To culminate these first years of continuous successes, in November SRUK/CERU was awarded the Innovation Award 2016 of the Forum of Innovative Spanish Companies (FEI).

Finally, in 2017 SRUK/CERU established further collaborations with the Spanish Cancer Research Association (ASEICA), the Higher Council for Scientific Research (CSIC) and the Confederation of Rectors of Spanish Universities (CRUE). The Young Researcher Basque Awards have been introduced in collaboration with Bizkaia Talent. Initiatives such as CineScience and Art and Science, have brought science closer to society thanks to the support of the Fundación Ramón Areces and Fundación Telefónica. The society has also raised concern and participated in numerous events regarding the potential effects that Brexit may have on the Spanish scientific community in the United Kingdom, has published a report on Women in Research, and has participated in demonstrations to promote Science and equality. In March 2017, SRUK/CERU joined the demonstrations of support for the March for Science.

Throughout its existence, SRUK/CERU has organised more than 250 scientific seminars, roundtables and outreach events, in addition to 5 Annual Symposia, where all members of the society meet yearly.

Among the researchers who have participated in the events organized by SRUK/CERU there are renowned personalities, such as Valentín Fuster, Ginés Morata, Peter Lawrence, Sir Tom Blundell, Sir Salvador Moncada, Uta Frith, Juan Luis Arsuaga, Francisco Mojica, Helen Lee, Alfonso Martínez Arias, Manel Esteller, Jenny Nelson, Stephen Curry, Laura Lechuga, Pedro Etxenike, Pedro Duque or Mara Dierssen.

The press, specially in Spanish, have echoed their activities on more than 200 occasions and the society's opinion has served as a reference for scientific and current issues, articles and interviews.

== Organisation ==
SRUK/CERU is only possible thanks to the effort of volunteers. It has a Board of Directors that manages and represents the members, seeks to fulfil the objectives of the community and defines the strategy for the growth and consolidation of the society. However, most of the research and outreach activities are organized at the local level via 8 constituencies that cover most of the British territory. These constituencies offer support, activities and events to the Spanish researchers in their regions.

Although all these constituencies organised activities from very early days, they were not officially established until the following dates:

1. London (August 2012)
2. Cambridge (August 2012)
3. South-West (May 2013)
4. Midlands (February 2014)
5. Oxford (December 2014)
6. North-West (January 2015)
7. Scotland (March 2015)
8. Yorkshire (October 2015)

Two other regions (Northern Ireland and the North-East) are currently in the process of becoming a formal constituency, for which they must achieve the minimum number of required members (8).

At another level, SRUK/CERU is organised into 4 departments and 5 committees with specific tasks:

- Online department (2013)
- Press department (2015)
- International Collaborations Department (2016)
- Science Policy Department (2016)
- Symposium Committee (2013, renewed annually)
- Scientific Committee (2014)
- Fellowships Committee (2014)
- Awards Committee (2016)
- Mentoring Committee (2016)

The directors of each constituency and department, together with the president, vice-president, secretary and treasurer, form the Board of Directors.
