= Bulletin des Sociétés Chimiques Belges =

- Discipline: Chemistry
- Language: French

Publication details
- History: 1904–1997
- Publisher: Société Chimique de Belgique (Belgium)

Standard abbreviations
- ISO 4: Bull. Soc. Chim. Belg.

Indexing
- CODEN: BSCBAG
- ISSN: 0037-9646

Links
- Journal homepage

The Bulletin des Sociétés Chimiques Belges (ISSN 0037-9646, CODEN BSCBAG) is the Belgium peer-reviewed scientific journal in chemistry. Originally it started under the name

- Bulletin de l'Association Belge des Chimistes [Vol. 1 (1887/88) to Vol. 17 (1903)],

but with Vol. 18 (1904) the title name changed. The journal is also known under the title

- Bulletin de la Société Chimiques de Belgique.

In 1998, this journal was absorbed by the European Journal of Organic Chemistry and the European Journal of Inorganic Chemistry.

== See also ==
- Anales de Química
- Chemische Berichte
- Bulletin de la Société Chimique de France
- European Journal of Organic Chemistry
- European Journal of Inorganic Chemistry
- Gazzetta Chimica Italiana
- Liebigs Annalen
- Recueil des Travaux Chimiques des Pays-Bas
- Chimika Chronika
- Revista Portuguesa de Química
- ACH—Models in Chemistry
