= Sofía Calero =

Spanish chemist and academic

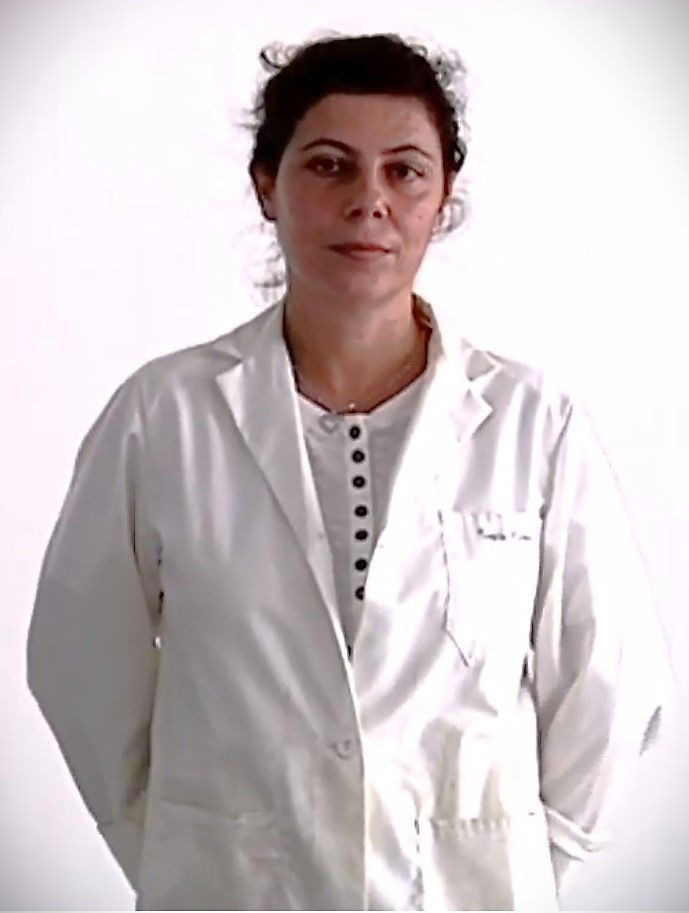
- Calero in 2013
- Education: Complutense University of Madrid
- Scientific career
- Workplaces: Eindhoven University of Technology; Pablo de Olavide University; University of Amsterdam
- Thesis: Propiedades dinámicas y termodinámicas de líquidos compuestos por moléculas lineales y complejas a partir de métodos mecanoestadísticos (2000)

Sofía Calero Diaz is a Spanish chemist who is a professor and Vice Dean of the Department of Applied Physics and Science Education at the Eindhoven University of Technology. Her research considers computational modelling of functional materials for applications in renewable energy. She was awarded the Spanish Royal Society of Chemistry Award for Scientific Excellence in 2018.

== Early life and education ==
Calero was born in Spain. She attended the Complutense University of Madrid and remained there for her doctoral research, which considered the thermodynamic properties of liquids of complex molecules. She moved to the University of Amsterdam as a Marie Curie Fellow.

== Research and career ==
Calero moved to the Pablo de Olavide University (UPO) in 2003, where she was named a Ramon y Cajal Fellow, and established a group who studied nanomaterials for applications in technologies. She was part of the European Cooperation in Science and Technology (COST) action on Computational materials sciences for efficient water splitting with nanocrystals from abundant elements. The programme looked to developed highly efficient energy converting devices (e.g. electrochemical cells for water-splitting). Calero was responsible for the development of Monte Carlo simulations of the project, and contributed to the software RASPA. RASPA is a simulation package that allows the study of adsorption and diffusion in nanoporous systems.

Calero moved to the Eindhoven University of Technology in 2020. She was made Vice Dean of the Department of Applied Physics and Science Education. She focuses on the simulation of materials for renewable energies and the development of force field to predict the functional properties of materials.

== Awards and honours ==
- 2005 Marie Curie Award for Excellence
- 2011 European Research Council Consolidator Award
- 2018 Spanish Royal Society of Chemistry Award for Scientific Excellence
- 2020 TU/e Irene Curie Grant

== Selected publications ==
- David Dubbeldam; Sofía Calero; Donald E. Ellis; Randall Q. Snurr (2015). "RASPA: molecular simulation software for adsorption and diffusion in flexible nanoporous materials". Molecular Simulation. 42 (2): 81–101. doi:10.1080/08927022.2015.1010082. S2CID 53077055. Wikidata Q60395799.
- D. Dubbeldam; S. Calero; T. J. H. Vlugt; R. Krishna; T. L. M. Maesen; B. Smit (2004). "United Atom Force Field for Alkanes in Nanoporous Materials". The Journal of Physical Chemistry B. 108 (33): 12301–12313. doi:10.1021/jp0376727. S2CID 14390433. Wikidata Q59281748.
- Sofia Calero; David Dubbeldam; Rajamani Krishna; Berend Smit; Thijs J H Vlugt; Joeri Denayer; Johan A. Martens; Theo L M Maesen (2004). "Understanding the role of sodium during adsorption: a force field for alkanes in sodium-exchanged faujasites". Journal of the American Chemical Society. 126 (36): 11377–11386. doi:10.1021/ja0476056. PMID 15355121. Wikidata Q51618932.
