= Recueil des Travaux Chimiques des Pays-Bas =

- Discipline: Chemistry
- Language: English, French

Publication details
- Former names: Recueil des Travaux Chimiques des Pays-Bas et de la Belgique, Recueil: Journal of the Royal Netherlands Chemical Society
- History: 1882-1996
- Publisher: Société Chimique Neerlandaise (Netherlands)
- Frequency: Monthly

Standard abbreviations
- ISO 4: Recl. Trav. Chim. Pays-Bas

Indexing
- CODEN: RTCPA3
- ISSN: 0165-0513
- LCCN: 46037482
- OCLC no.: 643799499

Links
- Journal homepage; Online archive

The Recueil des Travaux Chimiques des Pays-Bas was the Dutch scientific journal for chemistry. It was established in 1882, but from 1897 (vol. 16) to 1919 (vol 38) it was published under the title Recueil des Travaux Chimiques des Pays-Bas et de la Belgique (ISSN 0370-7539, CODEN: RTCPB4). From 1980 (vol. 99) to 1984 (vol. 103), the journal was published under the title Recueil: Journal of the Royal Netherlands Chemical Society (ISSN 0165-0513, CODEN: RJRSDK), but in 1985 (vol. 104), the title changed back to the original one. In 1997, the journal merged with Chemische Berichte and Liebigs Annalen to form Chemische Berichte/Recueil and Liebigs Annalen/Recueil, respectively.

In 1998 this journal was absorbed by the European Journal of Organic Chemistry and the European Journal of Inorganic Chemistry.

== See also ==
- Anales de Química
- Chemische Berichte
- Bulletin de la Société Chimique de France
- Bulletin des Sociétés Chimiques Belges
- European Journal of Organic Chemistry
- European Journal of Inorganic Chemistry
- Gazzetta Chimica Italiana
- Liebigs Annalen
- Chimika Chronika
- Revista Portuguesa de Química
- ACH—Models in Chemistry
