= María Escudero-Escribano =

Spanish chemist

María Escudero Escribano
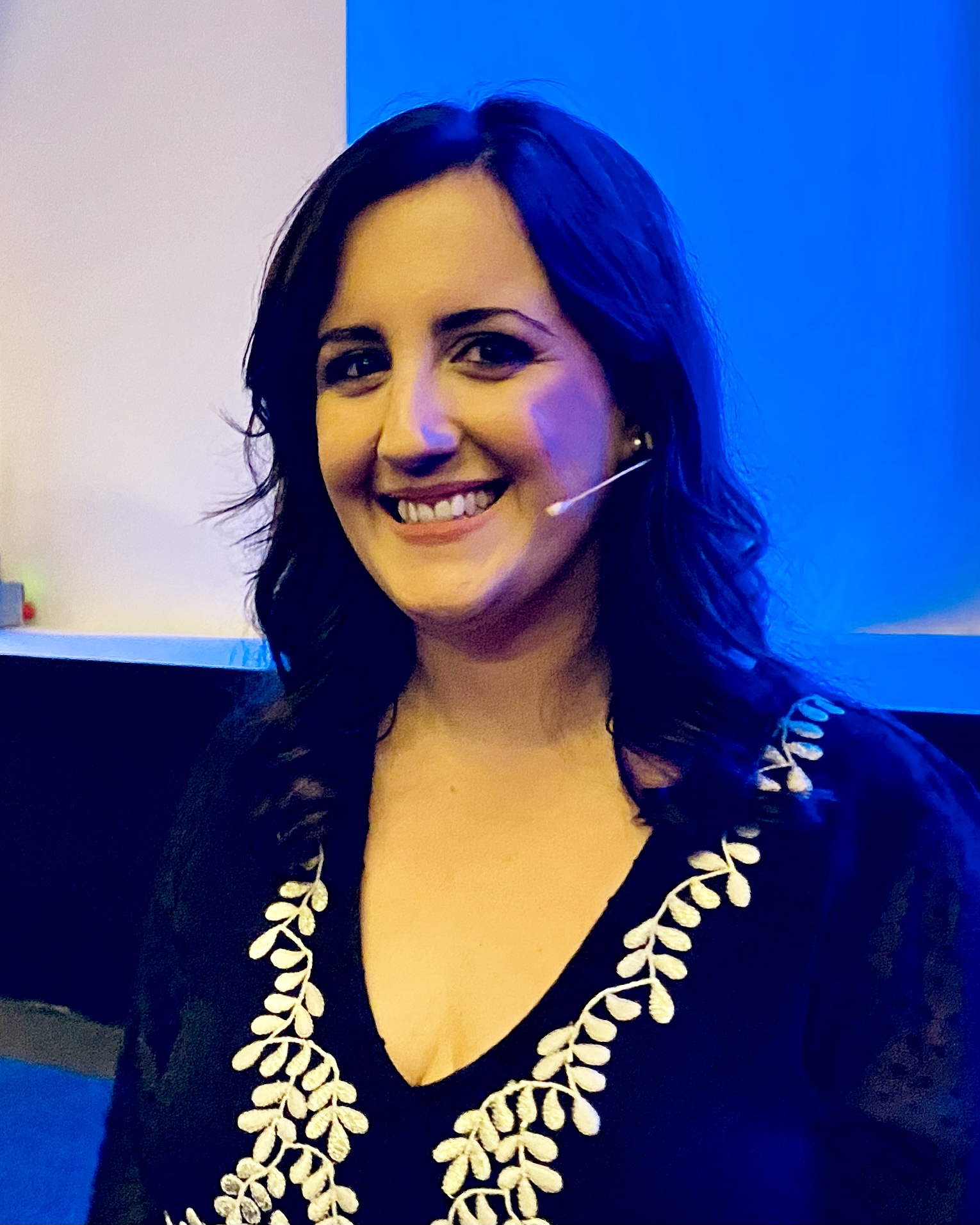
- Born: Cáceres, Spain
- Education: University of Extremadura; Autonomous University of Madrid
- Scientific career
- Workplaces: Catalan Institute of Nanoscience and Nanotechnology, Technical University of Denmark; University of Copenhagen
- Thesis: Electrocatalysis and surface nanostructuring: atomic ensemble effects and non-covalent interactions (2011)
- Doctoral advisor: Ángel Cuesta Ciscar

María Escudero-Escribano (born June 3, 1983) is a Spanish chemist. Her research considers the design of materials for catalysis, fuel cells and sustainable chemistry. She works at the Catalan Institute of Nanoscience and Nanotechnology (ICN2) as an ICREA Research Professor since September 2022. Formerly she was director of the Nano-Electrochemical group at the University of Copenhagen.

== Early life and education ==
Escudero-Escribano was born in Cáceres, Spain. Her father is a technical engineer who specialises in chemistry. She attended the Camilo Hernández de Coria public school until the age of thirteen, before moving to the Norba Caesarina Institute. She studied chemical engineering at the University of Extremadura. She moved to Madrid for her doctoral studies, earning a PhD at the Autonomous University of Madrid in 2011. She worked alongside Ángel Cuesta on the electrochemical reactions that take place inside fuel cells. During her doctorate she worked at the Residencia de Estudiantes as an intern, and completed visiting scientist positions at the Argonne National Laboratory and University of Ulm. The Spanish Royal Society of Chemistry selected the doctoral thesis of Escudero-Escribano as the best PhD in the region of Madrid. After earning her doctorate she joined the Technical University of Denmark as a postdoctoral researcher. Here she started working on novel electrocatalysts for fuel cells.

== Research and career ==
In 2017 Escudero-Escribano was appointed as a Professor at the University of Copenhagen, where she leads the Nano-Electrochemical group. Her research considers new materials for electrochemical reactions, and investigates them using in situ optical spectroscopy and microscopy. She is interested in using these materials for sustainable energy applications; including the generation of hydrogen through water splitting. In particular, Escudero-Escribano works on new catalysts for energy conversion devices. This involves searching for alternatives for the platinum catalysts that are typically used in fuel cells. She has developed platinum alloys that contain lanthanide elements which are more efficient.

She has considered the coupling of water electrolysers with other renewable sources, such as solar panels and windmills. Typically this coupling is complicated due to the intermittent power generation and low efficiency of renewable energy sources, but can be facilitated by developing the water electrolysers, where energy can be stored in the chemical bonds between hydrogen molecules. The efficiency of these electrolysers depends on the electrodes; in particular, the anode where the water oxidation takes place act as the bottlenecks of these devices.

In 2019 it was announced that the Danish National Research Foundation would support Prof. Jan Rossmeisl, with Escudero-Escribano as Co-PI, in establishing the Center for High Entropy Alloys Catalysis at the University of Copenhagen. The Centre looks to contribute toward decarbonisation, making a more sustainable chemical industry. Worldwide the chemical industry is responsible for almost 10 % of greenhouse gas emissions.

In 2022 she joined the Catalan institute of Nanoscience as an ICREA Research Professor . One of her outstanding projects is ATOMISTIC, which has been awarded with a Consolidator Grant from the European Research Council (ERC CoG): she works on atomic-scale tailored materials for electrochemical methane activation and production of valuable chemicals.

=== Awards and honours ===
- 2014 Sapere Aude - Research Talent Grant
- 2016 European Chemical Society (EuChemS) Young Chemist Award
- 2016 Young Researcher CIDETEC Award
- 2018 American Electrochemical Society Energy Technology Division Young Investigator Award
- 2018 Hyundai Young Series Talent Out of Series Award
- 2018 Princess of Girona Foundation Scientific Research Award
- 2019 Clara Immerwahr Award by UniSysCat
- 2019 Spanish Royal Society of Chemistry Young Researcher Award
- 2019 Nature Research Award for Inspiring Science Finalist
- 2021 Journal of Materials Chemistry Lecturer
