= Escribano =

Escribano is a Spanish surname. Notable people with the surname include:

- Ana María Escribano (born 1981), Spanish footballer
- Ángel Escribano (born 1971), Spanish businessman
- Beatriz Escribano (born 1990), Spanish handball player
- Carlos Escribano (born 1964), Spanish archbishop
- María Escribano (1954–2002), Spanish composer
- Paquita Escribano (1880–1970), Spanish singer

== See also ==
- María Escudero-Escribano (born 1983), Spanish chemist
- Irene Sánchez-Escribano (born 1992), Spanish steeplechase runner
