= Elvira Moya de Guerra =

Spanish physicist

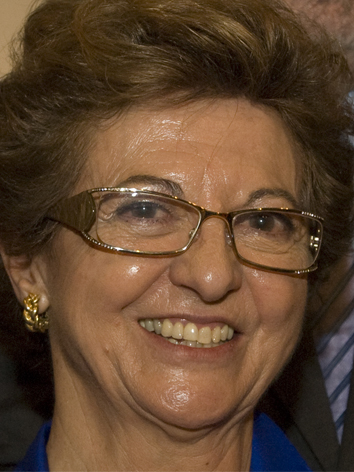
Elvira Moya de Guerra

Elvira Moya de Guerra (born Elvira Moya Valgañón, 19 February 1947) is a Spanish theoretical nuclear physicist who became the first female full professor of physics in Spain. She is a professor emerita of physics at the Complutense University of Madrid. Her research topics have included double beta decay.

== Education and career ==
Moya was born on 19 February 1947 in Albacete. After studying at the University of La Rioja, She held non-tenured teaching positions at the University of Zaragoza and Complutense University of Madrid from 1969 to 1974, while working towards her doctorate at the University of Zaragoza, which she completed in 1974. After postdoctoral research at the Massachusetts Institute of Technology from 1974 to 1979, and additional short-term teaching positions at the National University of Distance Education and Autonomous University of Madrid, she won a competition against eight men for a full professorship in physics in 1982, becoming Spain's first female physics professor. She took her chair at the University of Extremadura in 1983, and in 1986 became a research professor for the Cajal Institute of the Spanish National Research Council. In 2005 she moved to the Complutense University of Madrid. She retired in 2017.

== Recognition ==
In 2005, Moya was named a Fellow of the American Physical Society (APS), after a nomination from the APS Division of Nuclear Physics, "for research on theoretical nuclear physics involving microscopic theories for nuclear collective currents, nuclear structure and momentum distributions from electron scattering, and beta-decay nuclear matrix elements". In 2008 she was given the gold medal of the Spanish Royal Physical Society (RSEF), "for her prestige and leadership in the national and international scientific community in nuclear physics in related areas, as well as for her continuous collaboration with RSEF". She was the first Spanish woman to win either of these honors.

== Select publications ==
- E. Garrido; E. Moya de Guerra; P. Sarriguren; J. M. Udriaaas (1 October 1991). "Orbital 1(+) strengths from self-consistent deformed mean field calculations". Physical Review C. 44 (4): R1250–R1253. Bibcode:1991PhRvC..44.1250G. doi:10.1103/PHYSREVC.44.R1250. ISSN 2469-9985. PMID 9967591. Wikidata Q78089007.
- José M. Udías; Sarriguren P; Elvira Moya de Guerra; Eduardo Garrido; Juan A. Caballero (1 December 1993). "Spectroscopic factors in 40Ca and 208Pb from (e,e'p): Fully relativistic analysis". Physical Review C. 48 (6): 2731–2739. arXiv:nucl-th/9310004. Bibcode:1993PhRvC..48.2731U. doi:10.1103/PHYSREVC.48.2731. ISSN 2469-9985. PMID 9969149. Wikidata Q78095396.
- D. Berdichevsky; P. Sarriguren; E. Moya de Guerra; M. Nishimura; D. W. L. Sprung (1 July 1988). "Collective rotational transverse current multipoles: Even-even nuclei". Physical Review C. 38 (1): 338–358. Bibcode:1988PhRvC..38..338B. doi:10.1103/PHYSREVC.38.338. ISSN 2469-9985. PMID 9954807. Wikidata Q78033317.
