= Jordi Sort Viñas =

Catalan researcher (born 1976)

Professor Jordi Sort Viñas
- Born: 1976 (age 49–50); Terrassa
- Education: PhD Degree in Materials Science from UAB
- Awards: Jordi Porta i Jué's Prize, Young Researcher Award in Experimental Physics, Materials Science & Technology Prize from the Federation of European Materials Societies, Duran Farell Award, and the Young Scientific Prize at the ISMANAM Conference
- Scientific career
- Fields: Physics
- Institutions: Autonomous University of Barcelona; Catalan Institute of Nanoscience and Nanotechnology

Jordi Sort Viñas (born 1976) is a physicist working as an 'ICREA Research Professor' (Catalan Institution for Research and Advanced Studies) at the Autonomous University of Barcelona (UAB) and the Catalan Institute of Nanoscience and Nanotechnology in Spain leading the “Group of Smart Nanoengineered Materials, Nanomechanics and Nanomagnetism (Gnm3)” in the development of functional materials (thin films, nanoporous alloys and semiconductors, lithographed micro/nanostructures and nanocomposite/hybrid materials) for diverse applications. Sort received his PhD degree in Materials Science from UAB in 2002 (with qualification excellent cum laude, extraordinary award from UAB) later publishing more than 400 articles in peer-reviewed scientific journals that have received approximately 15000 citations.

== Biography ==
Sort leads the “Group of Smart Nanoengineered Materials, Nanomechanics and Nanomagnetism (Gnm3)” at UAB, created in 2011 and now consisting of around 20 researchers (including Physicists, Chemists and Materials Science Engineers). The research activities of the group focus on the development of novel types of functional materials (thin films, nanoporous alloys and semiconductors, lithographed micro/nanostructures and nanocomposite/hybrid materials) for diverse applications (magnetic, mechanical, biomedical, catalytic), with an environmentally sustainable, cost-effective and energy efficient approach. Among his main scientific achievements, one can mention: (i) new approaches to control the magnetic behavior of materials at the sub-micrometer scale by non-magnetic means, i.e., taking advantage of local mechanical strain, ion irradiation/implantation or electric field (magneto-electrics), (ii) the discovery of a novel magnetization reversal mechanism called “exchange biased vortex” in circular magnetic structures with applications in magnetic data storage and spin-valves, (iii) the enhancement of the mechanical, magnetic and catalytic properties of environmentally-sustainable nanoporous materials for energy efficiency applications.

Sort received his PhD degree in materials science from UAB in 2002 (with qualification excellent cum laude, extraordinary award from UAB). The topic of his PhD dissertation was the improvement of the magnetic properties of permanent magnetic materials taking advantage of interfacial exchange interactions in mixed ferromagnetic-antiferromagnetic nanocomposites. During his postdoctoral stay at the SPINTEC Laboratory (Grenoble, France), from 2002 to 2004, he developed magnetic multilayered systems with perpendicular anisotropy for spin valves and magnetic tunneling spintronic applications. He subsequently stayed at Argonne National Laboratory (USA) (2005-2006), where he specialized in nanomagnetism and studied the so-called 'exchange biased magnetic vortices'. He also performed secondments at Los Alamos National Laboratory (USA) and the Grenoble High Magnetic Fields Laboratory (France).

Sort has published more than 400 articles in peer-reviewed scientific journals that have received approximately 15000 citations (h = 60). He has issued 7 patents, has been personally invited in more than 150 international conferences and has managed more than 40 national/international research projects. He was the recipient of an ERC Consolidator Grant, an ERC Advanced Grant (from the European Research Council), two ERC Proofs of Concept, and the Coordinator of the SELECTA, BeMAGIC and IMPACT-IT Marie Sklodowska-Curie Doctoral Networks from the European Commission. His current research aims at integrating engineered nanoporous materials into novel spintronic applications, using voltage-driven ion motion (magneto-ionics) for brain-inspired advanced computing, as well as replacing hazardous or toxic compositions in miniaturized devices and coatings with innovative environmentally-friendly materials.

From an academic point of view, Sort is actively involved in teaching, participating in different subjects from the physics and nanoscience degrees, the Master of Materials Science and Technology at UAB and the Master of Nanotechnology and Materials Science. He was also the coordinator of the doctorate program in materials science at UAB during the period 2011–2014.

== Prizes and awards ==
Sort has received the Jordi Porta i Jué's Prize awarded by the Catalan Physical Society (2000), the Young Researcher Award in Experimental Physics by the Spanish Royal Physical Society (2003) and, more recently, the Materials Science & Technology Prize from the Federation of European Materials Societies (FEMS) (2015). He also received the Extraordinary Award for his PhD Dissertation at UAB and was awarded the Young Scientific Prize at the ISMANAM Conference in Paris in 2005.. Finally, he was also awarded by Naturgy and UPC (Premi Duran Farell 2020).
