= Pascuala García Martínez =

Spanish physicist

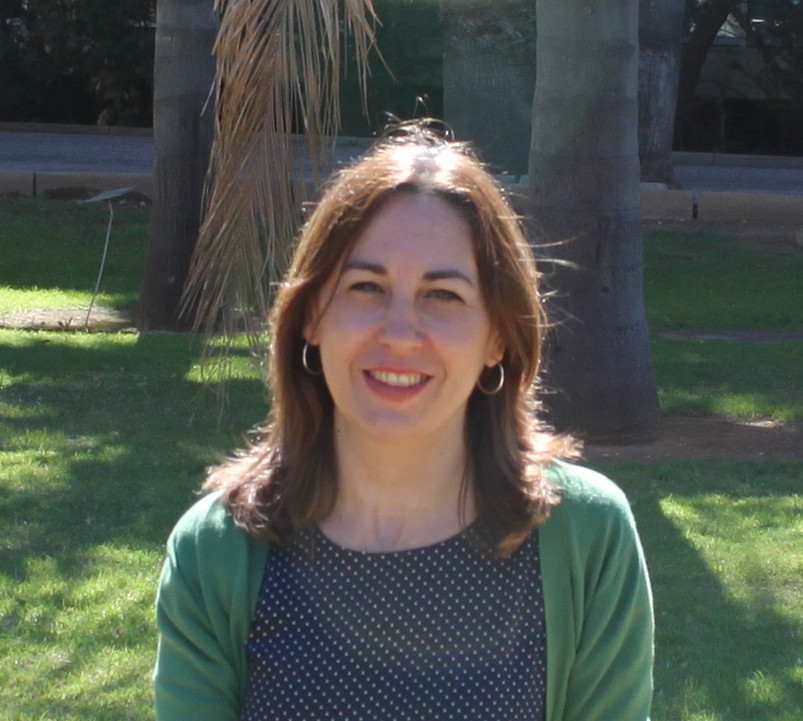
- Education: University of Valencia
- Awards: Fellow of SPIE
- Scientific career
- Fields: Photonics, optics, liquid crystals, optical imaging
- Workplaces: University of Valencia
- Thesis: Correlaciones morfologica i no lineals obtingudes per metodes opticodigitals (1998)
- Doctoral advisor: Carlos Ferreira García

Pascuala García Martínez is a Spanish physicist and Professor of Optics at the University of Valencia, where her research specialises in developing new optical and digital techniques for pattern recognition and imaging applications. She is a Fellow of the International Society for Optics and Photonics (SPIE).

== Early life and education ==
García Martínez studied physics at the University of Valencia, obtaining her bachelor's degree in 1993 and her PhD in 1998. She was a visiting doctoral researcher at Tel Aviv University.

== Research and career ==
In 1999, García Martínez became a postdoctoral researcher at the Center for Optics, Photonics and Lasers at Université Laval. She later returned to the University of Valencia, where she is now Professor of Optics in the Department of Physics.

Her research specialises in developing optical and digital methods for pattern recognition and image processing, for applications in holography, optical camouflage, 3D imaging. She also studies diffraction and polarization in spatial light modulators such as liquid crystals. Her research group works in collaboration with the Miguel Hernández University of Elche.

== Awards and honours ==
- Fellow of International Society for Optics and Photonics (SPIE), 2021
- President of the Spanish Royal Physics Society's Women in Physics group, since 2018
- Senior member of The Optical Society, 2015

== Publications ==
García Martínez has co-authored six book chapters and over 100 articles in peer-reviewed academic journals.
