= Italian Chemical Society =

National association for Italian chemists

- Società Chimica Italiana
- Formation: 1909; 117 years ago
- Founders: Chemical Society of Rome and Chemical Society of Milan
- Purpose: Science, academic
- Headquarters: Italy
- Leader: Luigi Mondello (2026-present)
- Website: Official website

The Italian Chemical Society (Italian: Società Chimica Italiana) is the national association in Italy representing the chemical sciences. Its main aim is to promote and support the development of chemistry and scientific research, spreading the knowledge of chemistry and its applications in order to improve the welfare of the country, establishing and maintaining relations with organizations from other countries with similar purposes and promoting the study of this subject at school and university.

== History ==
The Italian Chemical Society was formed in 1909 by the union of two existing societies, the Chemical Society of Rome, founded in 1902, and the Chemical Society of Milan, founded in 1895. The two original societies became sections of the new one and a third section was added in 1910, when the Chemical Society of Naples was incorporated.

During the First World War, the activity of the society experienced a marked decrease and the link among the three sections got was loosened, with the result that, in 1919, the section in Milan claimed its independence and became the Society of Industrial Chemistry (Societa′ di Chimica Industriale).

In 1928, the Society of Industrial Chemistry of Milan and the Society of General and Applied Chemistry of Rome merged into the Italian Association of Chemistry (Associazione Italiana di Chimica), which finally assumed the name of Italian Chemical Society on 1 January 1947, maintaining exactly the same structure as before.

== Publications ==
It is the publisher of the journal La Chimica e l'Industria (Chemistry and Industry) and also published, until 1997, the Gazzetta Chimica Italiana (Italian Chemical Bulletin), which converged, together with many other European publications, into the European Journal of Inorganic Chemistry and the European Journal of Organic Chemistry.

== Leadership ==
As of 2023, the president of the society is Professor Gianluca Farinola.
