= Laura Lechuga =

Spanish microbiologist

Laura M. Lechuga
- Education: Spanish National Research Council (CSIC)
- Scientific career
- Workplaces: Catalan Institute of Nanoscience and Nanotechnology (ICN2); University of Campinas; University of Tromsø
- Thesis: III-V semiconductor Schottky diodes for gas sensing and biosensing (1992)

Laura M. Lechuga Gómez (Seville, 1962) is a Spanish scientist who is a biosensor researcher and full professor. She leads the Nanobiosensors and Bioanalytical Application Group at the Catalan Institute of Nanoscience and Nanotechnology (ICN2).

She was director of the Department of Sensors and Biosensors of the IMM-CNM at the Spanish National Research Council (CSIC). She has written more than 250 highly consulted scientific publications and she is the owner of 8 families of Patents – several has been transferred to the industry through the spin-off companies SENSIA, S.L. and BIOD, S.L.-. She has been part of almost 85 Research projects, most of then international ones, and she is an active scientific promoter.

During the COVID-19 pandemic Lechuga developed a simple, low-cost and fast optical biosensor to detect COVID-19.

== Early life and education ==
She was born in Seville, Andalusia, in 1962. Whilst she was at high school she became interested in molecular biology. She studied chemistry at university, Universidad de Cádiz (Andalusia), where she was inspired to pursue a career in research. Lechuga completed her doctoral research at the Complutense University of Madrid. After earning her PhD in 1992, Lechuga was appointed as a postdoctoral researcher at the MESA+ Institute for Nanotechnology.

== Research and career ==
When Lechuga returned to Spain in 1995, she was appointed head of the biosensor group at the Microelectronics National Center from the Spanish National Research Council (CSIC). In 2008 she move to the Catalan Institute of Nanoscience and Nanotechnology (ICN2) in Barcelona. In 2012 was appointed an adjunct professor at the University of Tromsø, and in 2013 a visiting professor at the University of Campinas.

Lechuga develops silicon based biosensors which can be integrated into a lab-on-a-chip platform. She has developed different types of sensors, including; photonic Biosensors, Mach–Zehnder interferometers, opto-nano-mechanical sensors and magnetoplasmonic sensors. She looks to apply these sensors in clinical settings, for the diagnosis of cancer and other diseases, as well as environmental monitoring. In 2018 she demonstrated an interferometry-based point-of-care device for the fast and sensitive quantification of Escherichia coli. The device contained microarrays printed onto high performance nanoplasmonic substrates, and could even be used by non-expert personnel.

During the COVID-19 pandemic Lechuga developed a simple, low-cost and fast COVID-19 testing system. Her proposal came out of a rapid grant scheme that the European Commission established at the end of January 2020 in an effort to tackle the emerging pandemic. Lechuga developed the idea within ten days, making use of her experience building optical biosensors. The test is based on a nanoscale optical sensor and includes a receptor protein (antibody) that is capable of detecting the coronavirus. The sensor itself consists of a waveguide interferometer. It makes use of sample of saliva or sputum to detect the presence of SARS-CoV-2. If the saliva contains SARS-CoV-2, it will bind to the antibodies, and, in turn, change the transmission of a beam of light passing through the optical sensor. Once the light has been analysed the resulted will be transmitted to a smart phone or tablet, in a process that takes less than 30 minutes. Complementary DNA probes will identify the viral RNA without the need for Polymerase chain reaction (PCR).

== Awards and honours ==
- 2014 Elected a Fellow of The Optical Society
- 2016 Real Sociedad Española de Física (RSEF) – BBVA Physics, Innovation and Technology Award
- 2017 Inducted into AcademiaNet: The Portal to Excellent Women Academics

== Selected publications ==
- Sepúlveda, Borja; Angelomé, Paula C.; Lechuga, Laura M.; Liz-Marzán, Luis M. (2009). "LSPR-based nanobiosensors". Nano Today. 4 (3): 244–251. doi:10.1016/j.nantod.2009.04.001. ISSN 1748-0132.
- Estevez, M.C.; Alvarez, M.; Lechuga, L.M. (26 September 2011). "Integrated optical devices for lab-on-a-chip biosensing applications". Laser & Photonics Reviews. 6 (4): 463–487. doi:10.1002/lpor.201100025. hdl:10261/51022. ISSN 1863-8880. S2CID 123203743.
- Prieto, F; Sepúlveda, B; Calle, A; Llobera, A; Domínguez, C; Abad, A; Montoya, A; Lechuga, L M (2 July 2003). "An integrated optical interferometric nanodevice based on silicon technology for biosensor applications". Nanotechnology. 14 (8): 907–912. Bibcode:2003Nanot..14..907P. doi:10.1088/0957-4484/14/8/312. ISSN 0957-4484. S2CID 137122027.
- Lechuga, Laura (2021). Una científica saltando vallas. Plataforma Editorial. ISBN 978-84-18582-82-0.
