= Anales de la Real Sociedad Española de Química =

- Discipline: Chemistry
- Language: Spanish
- Edited by: Bernardo Herradón

Publication details
- History: 1999–present
- Publisher: Real Sociedad Española de Química (Spain)
- Frequency: Quarterly
- Open access: Yes

Standard abbreviations
- ISO 4: An. R. Soc. Esp. Quím.

Indexing
- ISSN: 1575-3417
- LCCN: 2007202019
- OCLC no.: 47071723

Links
- Journal homepage; Online access

The Anales de la Real Sociedad Española de Química is a peer-reviewed open access scientific journal in chemistry. It is the successor of Anales de Química and has been published by the Royal Spanish Society of Chemistry (Real Sociedad Española de Química) since 1999.
