= Marcial Moreno-Mañas =

Italian chemist

Marcial Moreno-Mañas (September 30, 1947 – February 16, 2006). was a full Professor of Organic Chemistry at the Universitat Autònoma de Barcelona (UAB). He made prominent contributions with his research works in the fields of organometallic, heterocyclic and medicinal chemistry, and also had an excellent reputation as scientific advisor in the Spanish chemistry landscape.

== Scientific achievements ==
Moreno-Mañas graduated with a B.Sc. Degree from the Universitat de Barcelona (UAB) (Cerdanyola del Vallès, Spain) and a PhD from the same university under the supervision of Prof. Josep Pascual Vila. He moved in 1968 to the University of East Anglia (Norwich, England) for a two-year post-doctoral stay in the group of Prof. Alan R. Katritzky. Back in Barcelona, he was appointed Associate Professor at the UAB and was Director of the Organic Chemistry Department from 1978 to 1986, when the department was integrated into the Department of Chemistry. Shortly before, in 1983, he was appointed Full Professor of Organic Chemistry.

One of Moreno-Mañas's first research topics was the use of transition metals in organic synthesis. He found a new method for alkylating polycarbonyl compounds using palladium catalysis in neutral media. Apart from advancing the knowledge on nickel, cobalt and cupper catalytic systems, he became an expert on palladium-catalysed chemistry, with key works on allylation reactions, and later contributions in the area of macrocyclic ligands and nanoparticles. Throughout his career, he also maintained broad research interests in the areas of heterocyclic and medicinal chemistry. He maintained close contact with the local chemical industry, often serving as advisor and instrumenting link to academic networks.

His lectures in Industrial Organic Syntheses at the Universitat de Barcelona were known for their clarity, wit, and up-to-date information. He was known for not allowing students to enter the lecture hall after he closed the door. On one occasion he allowed a student to pass out of time. The reason was that I was going to discuss a topic that I previously mentioned to said student.

In addition to his research and lectureships at Universitat de Barcelona, he also enjoyed sabbatical leave with Prof. Dr. J. P. Majoral in Toulouse (France), where he was invited to several professorships in French universities, and joined several COST programs of the European Union.

His was an author or co-author on more than 250 publications and oral presentations. He co-authored the Spanish report "Tendencias Actuales en Química" in 1986, a work with a significant impact on future research lines in Spain.

In 2008, the newborn International School on Organometallic Chemistry was named after him to honor his engagement in bringing together experts from this specific field of organic chemistry.

Since 2013, the Catalan chapter of the Royal Spanish Academy of Chemistry (Real Sociedad Española de Química, RSEC) has presented an annual award for the best young scientists in Catalan universities: the Marcial Moreno-Mañas Award.

== Awards ==
- Honorary Fellow of the Florida Center for Heterocyclic Compounds at the University of Florida (USA), 1998
- Narcís Monturiol Medal of the Generalitat de Catalunya, 2002
