= Ann. Phys. =

Ann. Phys. can refer to several physics journals:

- Annals of Physics, abbreviated Ann. Phys. (N. Y.), the American journal published by Elsevier
- Annalen der Physik, abbreviated Ann. Phys. (Leipzig) before 2008 or Ann. Phys. (Berl.) after 2008, the German journal published by Wiley-VCH
- Annales de Physique, abbreviated Ann. Phys. (Paris), the French journal that became European Physical Journal H in 2010

Not to be confused with:

- Anales de Física, abbreviated An. Fís., the Spanish journal published by the Royal Spanish Society of Physics
