= Antonio Fernández Rañada =

Spanish physicist (1939–2022)

Antonio Fernández-Rañada Menéndez de Luarca (1939 – 19 May 2022) was a Spanish theoretical physicist.

== Biography ==
Antonio Fernández-Ramada was born in Bilbao. Soon after his birth, his family moved to Oviedo, where he spent his childhood and youth until he began his university studies in Madrid. He graduated in physics with a licentiate from the Complutense University of Madrid. In 1965 he graduated with a PhD from the University of Paris with a thesis on causality and the S-matrix. In 1967 he defended his habilitation thesis Propiedades analítica en la difusión pión-nucleón (Analytic properties in pion-nucleon diffusion) at the Complutense University of Madrid.

He was employed at the Centro de Investigaciones Energéticas, Medioambientales y Tecnológicas (CIEMAT), formerly named the Junta de Energia Nuclear (Nuclear Energy Board). He taught quantum mechanics at the University of Barcelona and theoretical physics at the Complutense University of Madrid. He was appointed professor by the Universidad de Zaragoza and held the chair of electromagnetism at the Complutense University of Madrid.

Fernánez-Rañada was the director of the Grupo Interuniversitario de Física Teóretica (GIFT). He was the founding editor and editor-in-chief for ten years of the journal Revista Española de Física.

He did research on the physics of elementary particles, nonlinear dynamics, topics in mathematical physics, the relation between topology and quantum electrodynamics, and some problems in cosmology. He also published articles on how science is related other fields of knowledge and to societal issues. He was the author of the 1990 book Dinámica clásica (Classical dynamics), a coauthor of the 1997 book 100 problemas de la Mecánica (100 problems of mechanics), and a coauthor of the 2-volume, 2007 book Física básica (Basic physics). He also wrote expository works on science and its wider implications: Los científicos y Dios, Los muchos rostros de la ciencia, De la agresión a la guerra nuclear — coauthored with J. Martín-Ramírez, Heisenberg. Ciencia, incertidumbre y conciencia, and Breves apuntes sobre la comunicación de la ciencia.

== Awards and honors ==
- Research Prize in Physics from the Spanish Royal Academy of Sciences (1997)
- Medal of the Spanish Royal Physics Society (1985)
- Jovellanos International Essay Award (1994) for Los Muchos Rostros de la Ciencia
- Silver Medal of the Prince of Asturias (1999)
- President of the Principality of Asturias Council of Arts and Sciences
- President of the Spanish Royal Physics Society (2005-2010)
- Member of the Council of the European Physical Society
- Member of the Jury of the Princess of Asturias Award for Scientific and Technical Research

== Selected publications ==
=== Articles ===
- Fernández Rañada, Antonio (1967). "Causality and the S Matrix". Journal of Mathematical Physics. 8 (12): 2321–2326. Bibcode:1967JMP.....8.2321R. doi:10.1063/1.1705160.
- ——; Soler, Mario (1972). "Elementary Spinorial Excitations in a Model Universe". Journal of Mathematical Physics. 13 (5): 671–675. Bibcode:1972JMP....13..671R. doi:10.1063/1.1666035.
- ——; Vazquez, L. (1976). "Classical system of nonlinear dirac and Klein-Gordon fields". Progress of Theoretical Physics. 56 (1): 311–323. doi:10.1143/PTP.56.311.
- —— (1978). "S wave kinks of the Dirac-Weyl equation". Journal of Physics A: Mathematical and General. 11 (2): 341–346. Bibcode:1978JPhA...11..341R. doi:10.1088/0305-4470/11/2/011.
- ——; Rodero, Germán Sierra (1980). "Causality of a wave equation and invariance of its hyperbolicity conditions" (PDF). Physical Review D. 22 (2): 385–390. Bibcode:1980PhRvD..22..385R. doi:10.1103/PhysRevD.22.385.
- ——; Usón, Juan M. (1980). "Localized solutions of a charged nonlinear spinor field in a Coulomb-like potential". Journal of Mathematical Physics. 21 (5): 1205–1209. Bibcode:1980JMP....21.1205R. doi:10.1063/1.524545.
- ——; Rañada, Manuel F. (1983). "Confinement in nonlinear classical field theory: A model of dirac quarks". Physica D: Nonlinear Phenomena. 9 (1–2): 251–265. Bibcode:1983PhyD....9..251R. doi:10.1016/0167-2789(83)90302-0.
- Barut, A. O., ed. (1983). "Classical nonlinear Dirac field models of extended particles by Antonio F. Rañada". Quantum theory, groups, fields and particles. D. Reidel Publishing Company. pp. 271–291. ISBN 1-4020-0324-2.
- —— (1985). "A geometrical interpretation of the Pauli exclusion principle in classical field theory". Foundations of Physics. 15 (1): 89–100. Bibcode:1985FoPh...15...89R. doi:10.1007/BF00738739. S2CID 117932317.
- Arias Zugasti, Manuel; Estebaranz Gómez, José Manuel; Miró, Daniel García-Pablos; Llorente, Fernando Rodriguez; —— (1994). "Chaotic magnetic fields". Chaos, Solitons & Fractals. 4 (10): 1943–1959. Bibcode:1994CSF.....4.1943Z. doi:10.1016/0960-0779(94)90009-4.
- ——; Trueba, José L. (1997). "Two properties of electromagnetic knots". Physics Letters A. 232 (1–2): 25–33. Bibcode:1997PhLA..232...25R. doi:10.1016/S0375-9601(97)00366-6.
- ——; Soler, Mario; Trueba, José L. (1998). "A model of ball lightning as a magnetic knot with linked streamers". Journal of Geophysical Research: Atmospheres. 103 (D18): 23309–23313. Bibcode:1998JGR...10323309R. doi:10.1029/98JD01539.
- —— (2003). "The Light Speed and the Interplay of the Quantum Vacuum, the Gravitation of All the Universe and the Fourth Heisenberg Relation". International Journal of Modern Physics D. 12 (9): 1755–1762. Bibcode:2003IJMPD..12.1755R. doi:10.1142/S0218271803003980.
- Donoso, José; Trueba, José Luis; —— (2006). "The Riddle of Ball Lightning: A Review". The Scientific World Journal. 6: 254–278. doi:10.1100/tsw.2006.48. PMC 5917226. PMID 29861686. S2CID 20252555.
- ——; Tiemblo, Alfredo (3 September 2009). "A proposal that explains the Pioneer anomaly (version 5)". arXiv:0804.1904 [gr-qc].
- Barman, Victor; Lungu, Radu P., eds. (2012). "Topological electromagnetism: knots and quantization rules by Manuel Arrayás, José L. Trueba, and Antonio F. Rañada". Trends in Electromagnetism—From Fundamentals to Applications. InTech. pp. 71–88. ISBN 978-953-51-0267-0.
