= Catalan Institute of Nanotechnology =

Research center in Spain

The Catalan Institute of Nanotechnology (ICN) (NanoCAT or Institut Català de Nanotecnologia) was established in 2003 by the Catalan government and the Autonomous University of Barcelona (UAB). with the aim of attracting skilled international researchers to create a hub for nanoscience and nanotechnology research. In 2006, the collaboration with the Consejo Superior de Investigaciones Científicas (CSIC), the main Spanish scientific institution, began. Since then it has a new name as Instituto Catalán de Nanociencia y Nanotecnología (Catalan Institute of Nanoscience and Nanotechnology - ICN2).

== Research areas ==
Research focused in the following areas:

- Synthesis and applications of nanoparticles and nanotubes
- Design and synthesis of macromolecules for the integration of nanodevices
- Magnetism of thin films and spintronics
- Imaging and manipulation of atoms and molecules
- Theory of surfaces and inter-phases
- Interaction of biomaterials with inorganic matter

Following collaborations between the ICN and the Spanish government's Centre for Research in Nanoscience and Nanotechnology (CIN2), the ICN and the Spanish Research Council (CSIC) signed a memorandum of understanding of their official collaboration in 2006. This agreement was formalised in 2011, when CSIC representatives joined the ICN's board of patrons, and then in 2013, when the ICN changed its name to the Catalan Institute of Nanoscience and Nanotechnology (ICN2).
