= Gazzetta Chimica Italiana =

- Discipline: Chemistry
- Language: Italian

Publication details
- History: 1871-1997
- Publisher: Società Chimica Italiana (Italy)

Standard abbreviations
- ISO 4: Gazz. Chim. Ital.

Indexing
- CODEN: GCITA9
- ISSN: 0016-5603
- OCLC no.: 472409114

Gazzetta Chimica Italiana was an Italian peer-reviewed scientific journal in chemistry. It was established in 1871 by the Italian Chemical Society (Società Chimica Italiana), but in 1998 publication ceased and it was merged with some other European chemistry-related journals, to form the European Journal of Organic Chemistry and the European Journal of Inorganic Chemistry.

== See also ==
- Anales de Química
- Chemische Berichte
- Bulletin des Sociétés Chimiques Belges
- Bulletin de la Société Chimique de France
- European Journal of Organic Chemistry
- Liebigs Annalen
- Recueil des Travaux Chimiques des Pays-Bas
- Chimika Chronika
- Revista Portuguesa de Química
- ACH—Models in Chemistry
