= Luis Liz-Marzán =

Spanish chemist specializing in nanoscience (born 1965)

Luis Manuel Liz-Marzán (born 20 December 1965, Lugo) is a Spanish chemist who has worked in nanoscience, specialized in the synthesis of nanoparticles with special optical properties and their applications in biomedicine.

== Academic career ==
Liz-Marzán graduated in Chemistry at the University of Santiago de Compostela in 1988 and obtained a PhD in 1992 at the same university, presenting a PhD thesis entitled “Microemulsions. A new reaction medium for the synthesis of ultrafine magnetic particles”, under the supervision of Professor Arturo López-Quintela. After two years of postdoctoral research at Utrecht University, he returned to Spain in 1995, joining the University of Vigo, where he was promoted to Professor of Physical Chemistry in 2006. In 2012, he moved to San Sebastián, as an Ikerbasque Research Professor and Scientific Director of the Center of Cooperative Research in Biomaterials, CIC biomaGUNE. In 2022 he stepped down from the Scientific Director position, but remained as Ikerbasque Professor and leader of the Bionanoplasmonics Laboratory. Currently he holds a part-time chair at the University of Vigo, where he leads the Biomimetic Nanomaterials Group at the CINBIO Institute.

Liz-Marzán spent brief periods as a Visiting Professor in various institutions worldwide, such as Universität Hamburg (Germany), University of Michigan (USA), University of Melbourne (Australia), Tohoku University (Japan), as well as the Max Planck Institute of Colloids and Interfaces (Germany). He also visited the King Saud University (Saudi Arabia), École normale supérieure Paris-Saclay (France), Jiangnan University (China), and Collège de France in 2022. He holds an Honorary Chair at Soochow University (China).

== Research ==
The team led by Liz-Marzán has carried out work in several areas of nanoscience and relevant biomedical applications, such as synthesis, characterization, and modeling of nanoparticles and materials of interest in nanomedicine; monitoring of fibers related to the progress of Parkinson's disease, processing of nanoparticles in the form of self-assembled mono- and multi-layers, colloidal aggregates, and the development of cancer models to investigate disease mechanisms and subsequently develop new therapies. He co-authored more than 600 publications and 12 patents, and worked as an editor and editorial advisory board member of various prominent journals.

In 2011, Liz-Marzán conducted the European Research Council Advanced Grant for the project Development of plasmonic quorum sensors for understanding bacterial-eukaryotic cell relations, PLASMAQUO. Later that decade, in 2018, he conducted the European Research Council Advanced Grant for the project Four-Dimensional Monitoring of Tumour Growth by Surface Enhanced Raman Scattering, 4DbioSERS. Starting in 2025, he is part of a consortium that carries out the European Research Council Synergy Grant Handshake Complexes between Chiral Nanoparticles and Proteins, CHIRAL-PRO.

== Awards ==
- "Lourenço - Medinaveitia" Award of the Portuguese Chemical Society (2023)
- Ciamician - Gonzalez" Award of the Italian Chemical Society (2022)
- Lilly Foundation Prize on Preclinical Biomedical Research (2021)
- "Miguel Catalán - Paul Sabatier" Prize of the French Chemical Society (2020)
- "Hermanos Elhuyar - Hans Goldschmidt" Award (German Chemical Society, GDCh) (2019)
- "Enrique Moles" National Research Award in Chemical Science and Technology (2018)
- Blaise Pascal Medal in Materials Science (European Academy of Sciences) (2017)
- JCIS-Darsh Wasan Award in Colloid and Interface Science (Elsevier) (2017)
- Rey Jaime I Prize in Basic Research (2015)
- Medal of the Spanish Royal Society of Chemistry (2014)
- ECIS Rhodia Prize (European Colloid and Interface Society) (2013)
- Langmuir Lecturer Award (American Chemical Society) (2012)
- ACS Nano Lectureship Award (American Chemical Society) (2012)
- Burdinola Research Award (2011)
- DuPont Prize for Science (2010)
- Physical Chemistry Award of the Spanish Royal Society (2009)
- Humboldt Research Award (2009)

== Recognitions ==
- Honorary Doctor in Sciences at the University of Antwerp
- Foreign academic of the Accademia Nazionale dei Lincei
- International Member of the National Academy of Engineering (USA)
- Member of the Real Academia de Ciencias Exactas, Físicas y Naturales (2020)
- Corresponding Member of the Real Academia Gallega de Ciencias
- Corresponding Member of the Academia de Ciencias Matemáticas, Físico-Químicas y Naturales de Granada
- Member of Academia Europaea
- Member of the European Academy of Sciences
- Fellow of Optical Society of America
- Fellow of Royal Society of Chemistry
