= Christian Friedrich Bucholz =

German chemist

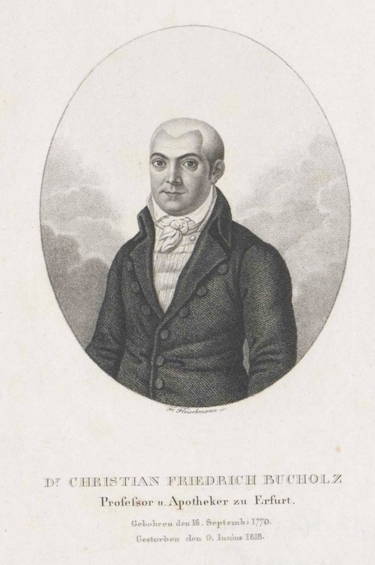

Christian Friedrich Bucholz (19 September 1770 – 9 June 1818) was a German pharmaceutical chemist who is credited with the isolation of the oleoresin capsaicin in a crude form from chilli peppers using solvent extraction in 1816.

== Life and work ==
Bucholz was born in Eisleben and his father worked as an apothecary. When his father died when he was still five years old, his mother married a pharmacist in Erfurt named Voigt who along with an uncle W.H.S. Bucholz trained the young boy in laboratory techniques. In 1784 he went to apprentice under the Kassel pharmacist Karl Wilhelm Fiedler and in 1794 published his first paper on the crystallization of barium acetate. In the same year he returned to Erfurt to take over his father's pharmacy.

In 1805 he discovered high solubility of uranyl nitrate in organic solvents, including diethyl ether, and first studied its partitioning between water and ether depending on the concentration. This finding laid a foundation for some early methods of uranium purification and laid the basis for modern nuclear reprocessing.

In 1808 he was received a doctorate of pharmacy from the University of Rinteln Collegium medicum et sanitatis and in 1810 he became a professor of chemistry at the Erfurt Academy. He published numerous scientific works and was mainly involved in chemical analysis. In 1815 he was a privy councillor for the town of Schwarzburg-Sonderhausen and in the same year he founded a syndicate of apothecaries. When the French occupied Erfurt in 1813 he was imprisoned and ill health later led to blindness. His later work was possible through a student Rudolph Brandes. In 1816 he published a note on the extraction of a crude compound called capsaicin which was the spicy component of chilli peppers. This paper was published in the Almanach oder Taschenbuch für Scheidekünstler und Apotheker in 1816 and a year later Henri Braconnot found that it could form salts with alkalis and gave it the name capsicin and a pure crystal was extracted by John C. Thresh in 1876 and named as capsaicin.
