= Rudolph Brandes =

German apothecary and chemist

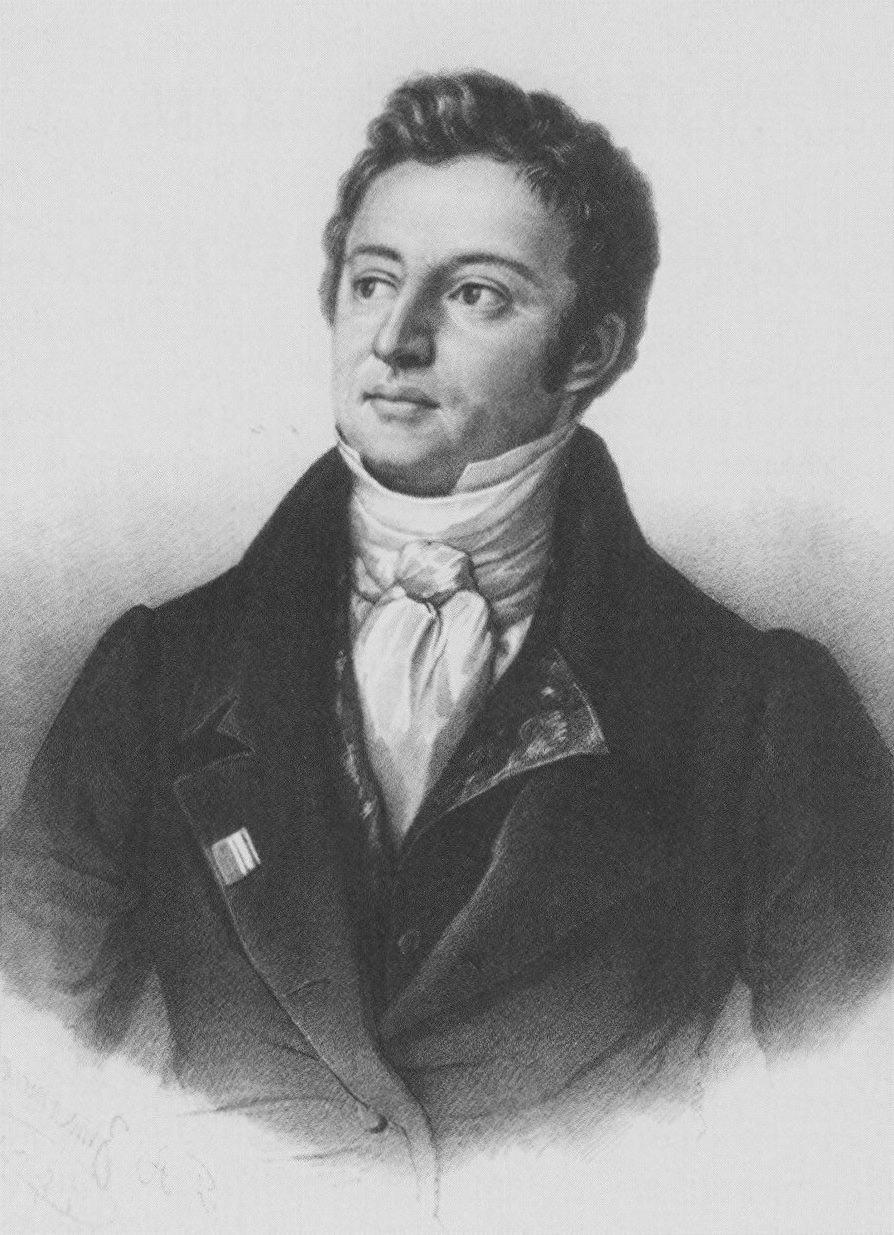
Portrait by F. A. Zimmerman, 1838

Rudolph Brandes (18 October 1795 – 3 December 1842) was a German apothecary and chemist who served as the founding editor of the journal Archiv des Pharmazie from 1822. He also took an interest in meteorology and collaborated with Johann Wolfgant von Goethe and Alexander von Humboldt.

== Life and work ==
Brandes was born in Salzuflen, the son of pharmacist Johann Gottlieb (1751–1816) and Friederike née Nolte. His father held license for their pharmacy in Salzuflen from 1792 and the pharmacy still exists. After studies at Osnabrück and Erfurt and he went to the University of Halle where he received a doctorate in 1817 for a dissertation titled Dissertatio de Strontiane mineralogico-chemica guided by Dr Dobereiner from Jena. His father died on October 16, 1816, and the son returned to take over his father's pharmacy. Brandes worked initially with Bucholz and after his death in 1818, he continued to work on plant compounds. He used his analytical chemistry skills to purify and characterize a number of chemical compounds including delphinine (1819), atropine (1822), hyoscyamine, and acrolein (1838). He travelled to visit pharmacists associations in France and on one visit met Alexander von Humboldt and they corresponded with Goethe (and met him in Weimaer in 1828) on meteorology and drew weather maps. Brandes took an interest in the composition of mineral springs in Europe. In 1820 he founded the group Apothekerverein im nördlichen Teutschland along with August Peter Julius Du Mênil, Ernst Witting, and Friedrich Wilhelm Beissenhirtz, which started publishing the Archiv der Pharmazie, a publication that continues to be published today. The journal was merged with the Liebigs Annalen in 1832, though due to disagreements with Justus von Liebig it started being published independently in 1935; the journal would undergo several changes in name in the following 200 years of its existence. He also established a pharmacists' association in northern Germany that he oversaw until his death. The plant genus Brandesia was named in his honour but is now a synonym of Alternanthera.
