= Native Scientists =

Non-profit educational organisation

- Founded: London, 2013
- Purpose: Promoting and exploiting cultural and linguistic diversity in STEM (science, technology, engineering and maths)
- Headquarters: London
- Directors: Joana Moscoso
- Founders: Joana Moscoso, Tatiana Correia
- Website: www.nativescientists.org

Native Scientists is a non-profit organisation operating in various European countries to broaden the horizons of underserved children (6 to 16 years). It develops and implements programs that establish meaningful connections between pupils and scientists to promote science and language literacy. Other aims include inspiring migrant young people to consider careers in STEM and training scientists to communicate their work to non-scientists. According to their latest internal report, the organization has managed to establish over 20,000 connections (i.e meaningful interactions) between children and scientists through its different programs.

== History ==
Native Scientists was founded in 2013 by two Portuguese scientists, Joana Moscoso, a biologist, and Tatiana Correia, a physicist, who met while studying in the UK. The organization was created to reduce inequalities affecting underserved children in the access to higher education and STEM subjects. In a recent publication in the OECD “The Forum Network”, Joana Moscoso, one of the founders, revealed that this motivation was rooted in personal history:

“The odds for me to become a scientist were very slim. I was born a girl in the ‘80s, I grew up in a village far away from scientific or higher education institutions, my native language was not English, and no one in my family or around me had graduated with a Ph.D. or was enrolled in a science career. According to evidence, my family background, native language, birthplace and, to top it all, my gender, did not favour a scientific career.”

Native Scientists is mainly fueled by volunteer work from a wide network of international scientists.

== Activities and Workshop Format ==
Native Scientists' projects share the philosophy that creating meaningful connections between pupils and scientists is critical to achieving the organization’s goals. Science outreach activities are therefore premised on establishing common ground, which can be found in a shared heritage language, culture, or upbringing. "Native Schools", which joins international STEM scientists and migrant pupils in schools to speak about science in their heritage language, is Native Scientists' oldest and most successful endeavor. During approximately 60 minutes workshops, groups of 4/5 children interact with different scientists in a carousel, speed dating, style, which promote active and critical participation through language integrated learning.

These workshops connect underserved children with role models of similar cultural background, aiming at increasing scientific literacy, encouraging scientific careers, and valuing multilingualism. Initially operating only in the UK for Portuguese-speaking communities, the project has now expanded to other international communities inside the UK and other European countries, including France, Norway, Germany, Sweden, Ireland and the Netherlands.

Native Scientists also runs the program “Cientista Regressa à Escola” which prompts Portuguese scientists to return to the schools where they originally studied to share their research and career path. One of the major Portuguese newspapers, “Público”, wrote a profile on this particular program. The piece covered a workshop which took place in Foros de Arão, a small rural village of Alentejo, and highlighted the view of one of the teachers of the elementary school:

“[she] notes that children of this age are not very aware of a scientist’s role. ‘ When we ask them [the children] what they want to be when they’re older, they usually answer firemen or policemen. Being a scientist is not something which feels close to them.’ The teacher also thinks that growing up in a rural setting makes science seem like a distant activity.”

Other programs include “Cartas com Ciência”, through which pupils and scientists from the CPLP exchange written letters, “Native Explorers", which hosts events for older children and teenagers in museums, universities and research centers, and “Native Training”. which trains scientists on science communication and outreach. The organization has also launched scientific podcasts for children, school educational resources authored by scientists, and a collection of interviews about the benefits and challenges of being multilingual

== Partnerships ==
The organizations is formally associated with more than 30 other European institutions, including other scientific and international associations, language institutes and universities. Notable partners include the Calouste Gulbenkian Foundation, the Goethe Institute, Instituto Camões and the Elsevier Foundation.

== Awards ==
- 2014: Microbiology Outreach Prize, Microbiology Society (awarded to director Joana Moscoso)
- 2015: Outreach and Engagement Award, Royal Society of Biology (awarded to director Joana Moscoso)
- 2016: President's Inspirational Partner Award, Imperial College London
- 2017: Director Joana Moscoso was selected among the MIT Innovators Under 35
- 2017: Heriot-Watt Principal's Public Engagement Prize (awarded to Ana Catarino, Native Scientists Coordinator in Scotland)
- 2018: EU label for 2018 European Year of Cultural Heritage
- 2018: 'Highly Commended' distinction by STEM Inspiration Awards
- 2021: "Falling Walls Engage" Winner

Native Scientists created the Native Awards to recognise the creativity of pupils in the Native Schools project. Pupils are asked to draw what a scientist is for them, as well as to imagine and write a sentence of what they would do if they were a scientist.
