= Spanish Royal Physics Society =

Non-profit institution for physics

The Spanish Royal Physics Society (RSEF) is a non-profit institution for physics resulting from the 1980 division of the Spanish Royal Society of Physics and Chemistry into the Royal Society of Chemistry and the RSEF. The RSEF aims to promote and develop the basic knowledge of physics and its applications, and to encourage scientific research and teaching of physics in all reaches of education. The RSEF operates on a national scale and maintains international relations with other Iberoamerican societies with similar aims.

The RSEF is structured into specialized groups and divisions for different areas of physics, such as the Condensed Matter Division, and local sections, grouping members in different parts of Spain. It also includes a foreign section for international RSEF members.

RSEF members consists of individual members, as well as corporate members for institutions or business companies.

The RSEF is a member of the European Physical Society, Federation of Iberoamerican Physics, and the Confederation of Scientific Societies of Spain, and maintains cooperative agreements with other societies such as the American Physical Society and Portuguese Physical Society.

== Early history ==
The original Spanish Royal Society of Physics and Chemistry (RSEFQ) was founded on 23 January 1903, at the dean's offices of the Universidad Central at Calle Ancha de San Bernardo in Madrid. The certificate of incorporation undersigned by José Echegaray reads: "... the aim of the meeting ... was to reach an agreement for the incorporation of the Spanish Society of Physics and Chemistry destined to conducting studies and publishing the results thereof in these disciplines by individuals adhering to this idea."

The first governing board of the RSEFQ was established as follows:

President	José Echegaray Eizaguirre(civil engineer)
Vice-presidents	Francisco de Paula Rojas (professor, faculty of science) Gabriel de la Puerta (professor, faculty of pharmacy)
Treasurer	Juan Fages Virgili (professor, faculty of science)
Board members	José Rodríguez Carracido (professor, faculty of science) Eugenio Piñerúa (professor, faculty of science) Federico de la Fuente (professor, School of Arts and Industries) Eduardo Mier Miura (geographical engineer)
Secretaries	José Rodríguez Mourelo (professor, School of Arts and Industries)

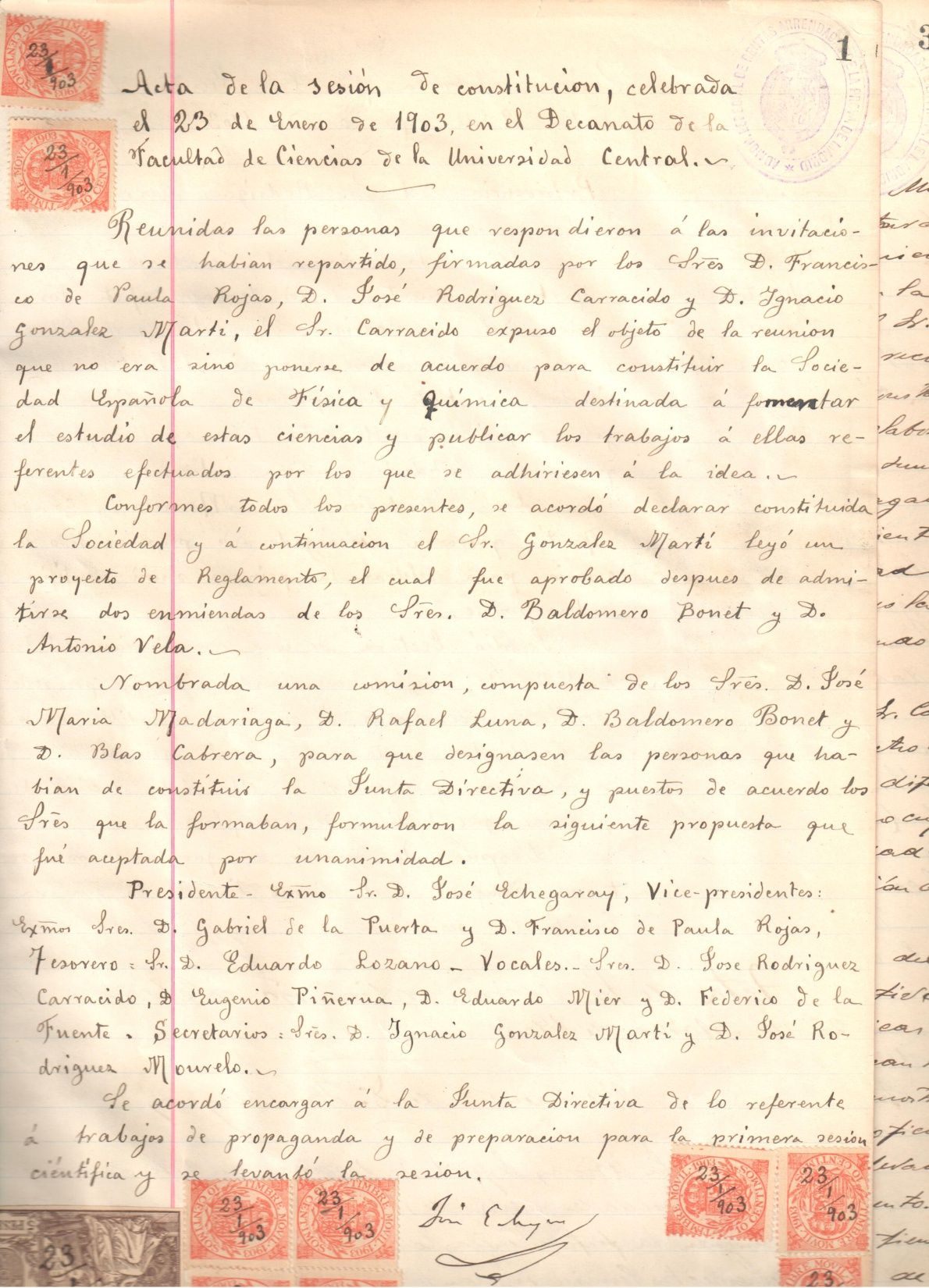
Minutes of the constituent assembly of the former Spanish Society of Physics and Chemistry held on 23 January 1903, signed by the Nobel Prize in Literature, mathematician, civil engineer, and politician José Echegaray

Originally, the RSEFQ was made up of contemporaries of the 1800s, who held a majority in the society's governing bodies. These were, or were to become, members of the Royal Academy of Sciences with the exception of de la Fuente and Piñerúa, who were members of the Academy of Medicine. They all practiced their profession, as university professors for the most part, in Madrid. This criterion was maintained for the governing board until 1923 when four members who did not reside in the capital were admitted.

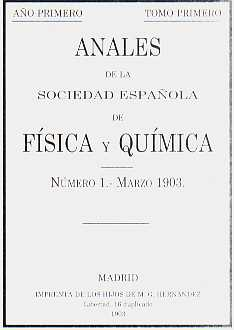
Cover of the first issue of Anales de la Sociedad Española de Física y Química 1903

From the 1920s, thanks to scholarships awarded by the Junta para Ampliación de Estudios, a large number of Spanish physicists and chemists had travelled abroad and renowned scientists had visited Spain, including Marie Curie, Albert Einstein, and Arnold Sommerfeld. Furthermore, the society gradually became integrated in other scientific societies such as the International Union for Cooperation in Solar Research or the International Union of Pure and Applied Chemistry, and was invited to send delegations to various international conferences and commemorations. Some society scientists (including Santiago Ramón y Cajal and Leonardo Torres Quevedo) were invited as conference speakers and their works translated. For example, "father of Spanish physics" Blas Cabrera (who was president of the RSEFQ in 1916) took part in the Solvay Conferences of 1930 and 1933.

When the First World War broke out in 1914, the society's activity suffered little impact at first, despite foreign journals becoming harder to come by and the increasing difficulties faced to obtain products and apparatus from abroad. Instead, the society took a greater interest in disseminating scientific information within Spain, strengthening ties with teaching centres, and seeking the collectivization of societies and other national institutions with scientific interests.

The society's contribution to improving scientific education and research in Spain received a very welcome recognition in the year of its silver anniversary (1928), when the RSEFQ was granted a royal charter by King Alfonso XIII. While this distinction gave the Society recognition within Spain, it was only a few years later, in 1934, that international recognition became widespread when the RSEFQ held in Madrid the 9th International Chemistry Congress, bringing together more than 1,500 chemists from many countries.

Following the 1936–1939 Spanish Civil War, the society increased its number of territorial (local) sections, and the first specialised groups were formed. Toward the end of the 1930s, the society was split into two fully independent societies, the Spanish Royal Physics Society (RSEF) and the Spanish Royal Chemistry Society (RSEQ). The first president of the RSEF was Carlos Sanchez del Río y Sierra, a professor of Nuclear Physics at the Faculty of Physical Sciences of the Universidad Central de Madrid (today's Universidad Complutense de Madrid). The first Divisions in the RSEF were created in 2017.

== Emblem ==
After its 2003 Centenary celebrations, the RSEF set about designing the Society's emblem, an initiative that had been delayed at the time when the RSEFQ was divided in 1980.

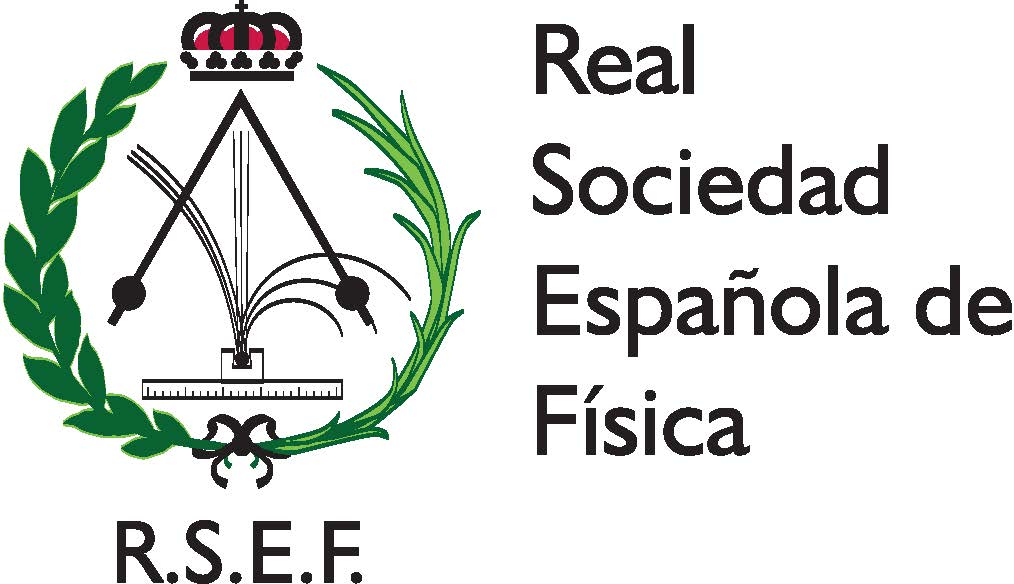
Emblem of the RSEF

Turquoise blue, the academic color for the classical faculty of Exact, Physical, and Natural Science, is the predominant colour on the RSEF website.

The final RSEF emblem was presented by incorporating symbols associated with physics. It appeared for the first time in 2005 on the Minutes of the Junta de Gobierno (the RSEF's full Governing Body).

== Presidents ==
After 1980, the RSEF has had the following Presidents:

- 1980–84: Carlos Sánchez del Río y Sierra
- 1984–88: Maximino Rodríguez Vidal
- 1988–93: Alfredo Tiemblo Ramos
- 1993–97: José María Savirón de Cidón
- 1997-05: Gerardo Delgado Barrio
- 2005–10: Antonio Fernández Rañada
- 2010–13: María del Rosario Heras Celemín
- 2013–21: José Adolfo de Azcárraga Feliu
- 2021-present: Luis Viña Liste

== Divisions, specialised groups, and local sections ==
Since the 1970s, a variety of Local Sections and Specialised Groups has emerged within the RSEF (formerly RSEFQ). In 2017 the RSEF Divisions were created.

== Publications ==
The research journal Anales de Física, published by the RSEFQ, was split into two series between 1981 and 1992 and later reunited between 1992 and 1998. Over this period, the submission of papers for publication began to dwindle.

Finally, the RSEF journal was discontinued after the second issue in 1998, when Anales de Física was merged with several other European journals to found the European Physical Journal. The RSEF published a closing issue of Anales was published in 2000.

Today, the RSEF publishes the Revista Española de Física, which contains articles of general interest as well as provides information on the life of the Society, and a monthly Boletín Informativo, which is distributed via email to Society members.

== Awards ==
Since 2006, the RSEF has established a number of awards, granted in collaboration with the Fundación BBVA.

== See also ==
- Appendix: Spanish Royal Physics Society Awards
- Real Sociedad Española de Química (RSEQ)
