= Molecular Simulation (journal) =

Scientific journal

- Discipline: Molecular modelling; molecular dynamics
- Language: English
- Edited by: Nick Quirke

Publication details
- History: 1987—present
- Publisher: Taylor & Francis
- Frequency: 18/year
- Impact factor: 2 (2024)

Standard abbreviations
- ISO 4: Mol. Simul.

Indexing
- CODEN: MOSIEA
- ISSN: 0892-7022

Links
- Journal homepage; Online access; Online archive

Molecular Simulation is a peer-reviewed scientific journal published by Taylor & Francis. Established in 1987, it covers research on the development and applications of molecular modelling and molecular dynamics methods. Its current editor-in-chief is Nick Quirke (Imperial College).

== Abstracting and indexing ==
The journal is abstracted and indexed in:

- Chemical Abstracts Core
- Current Contents/Physical, Chemical & Earth Sciences
- EBSCO databases
- Ei Compendex
- Science Citation Index Expanded
- Scopus
- zbMATH Open

According to the Journal Citation Reports, the journal has a 2024 impact factor of 2.
