= Philipp Lorenz Geiger =

German chemist and pharmacist (1785–1836)

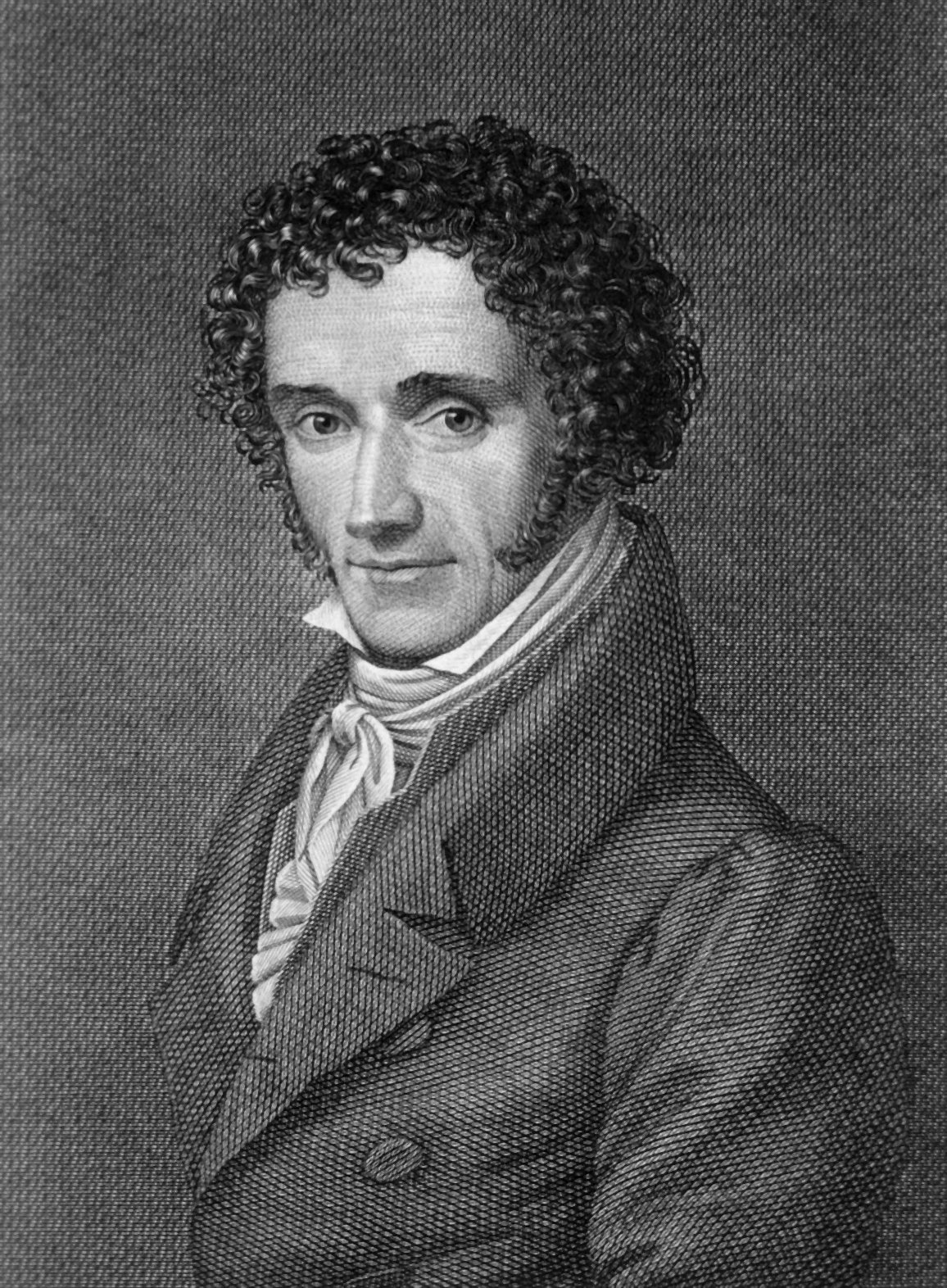
Philipp Lorenz Geiger

Philipp Lorenz Geiger (29 August 1785 in Freinsheim – 19 January 1836 in Heidelberg) was a German pharmacist and chemist known for his work with plant alkaloids.

From the age of 14 he worked as an apprentice pharmacist in Adelsheim, followed by pharmacy training as an assistant in Heidelberg, Rastatt and Karlsruhe. Around 1811 he took over management of a pharmacy in Lörrach, then from 1814 to 1821, was associated with the pharmacy at the University of Heidelberg. In the meantime he obtained his PhD (1817) and habilitation (1818). In 1824 he was named an associate professor, an appointment that was made against the will of Leopold Gmelin, a professor of chemistry at Heidelberg.

With Ludwig Hesse, he isolated the alkaloids atropine, aconitine, colchicine and hyoscyamine. In 1831 he was the first to obtain coniine in a pure state.

== Published works ==
From 1824 to 1836 he was editor of the journal "Magazin für Pharmacie und die dahin einschlagenden Wissenschaften" (volumes 7–36). Also, he was the author of the first volume of the "Pharmacopoeia universalis", its second volume being written in conjunction with Karl Friedrich Mohr. Other published works by Geiger include:

- Pharmaceutische Botanik; with Christian Gottfried Daniel Nees von Esenbeck, (2nd edition, 2 volumes, 1839–40).
- Pharmaceutische Zoologie, (2nd edition, 1839).
- Handbuch der Chemie : mit Rücksicht auf Pharmacie, with Justus Liebig, (5th edition, 2 volumes, 1843).

The standard author abbreviation Geiger is used to indicate this person as the author when citing a botanical name.
