= European Journal of Organic Chemistry =

- Discipline: Organic chemistry
- Language: English
- Edited by: Anne Nijs

Publication details
- History: 1998–present
- Publisher: Wiley-VCH on behalf of Chemistry Europe
- Frequency: Weekly
- Open access: Hybrid
- Impact factor: 3.261 (2021)

Standard abbreviations
- ISO 4: Eur. J. Org. Chem.

Indexing
- CODEN: EJOCFK
- ISSN: 1434-193X (print); 1099-0690 (web)

Links
- Journal homepage

The European Journal of Organic Chemistry is a weekly peer-reviewed scientific journal covering organic chemistry. It is published by Wiley-VCH on behalf of Chemistry Europe.

The journal, along with the European Journal of Inorganic Chemistry, was established in 1998 as the result of a merger of Chemische Berichte/Recueil, Bulletin de la Société Chimique de France, Bulletin des Sociétés Chimiques Belges, Gazzetta Chimica Italiana, Recueil des Travaux Chimiques des Pays-Bas, Anales de Química, Chimika Chronika, Revista Portuguesa de Química, and ACH-Models in Chemistry.

According to the Journal Citation Reports, the journal has a 2021 impact factor of 3.261.

== See also ==
- List of chemistry journals
- European Journal of Inorganic Chemistry
