= Anales de Física =

- Discipline: Physics
- Language: English, Spanish

Publication details
- History: 1968–1998
- Publisher: Real Sociedad Española de Física (Spain)

Standard abbreviations
- ISO 4: An. Fís.

Indexing
- CODEN: AFISEX
- ISSN: 1133-0376
- LCCN: 94656128
- OCLC no.: 29164947

Anales de Física was a peer-reviewed scientific journal covering research in all areas of physics published by the Royal Spanish Society of Physics (Real Sociedad Española de Física). It continued Anales de la Real Sociedad Española de Física y Química/Serie A, Física and its first independent title was:

- Anales de Física, 1968 (vol 64) to 1980 (vol. 76; ISSN 0365-4818, CODEN: ANFIA6)

From 1981 (vol. 77 (1981) to Vol. 87 (1992) the journal was split in two sections:

- Anales de Física/Serie A, Fenómenos e Interacciones (ISSN 0211-6243, CODEN: AFAIDU),
- Anales de Física/Serie B, Aplicaciones, Métodos e Instrumentos (ISSN 0211-6251, CODEN: AFBIDZ).

Finally, the journal was renamed to

- Anales de Física, 1992 (vol. 88) to 1998 (vol. 94; ISSN 1133-0376, CODEN: AFISEX)

Publication ceased after issue no. 2, 1998, when the journal was merged with several other European journals in the European Physical Journal. The Royal Spanish Society of Physics is now publishing two other journals entitled Revista Española de Física and Revista Iberoamericana de Física.
