= European Journal of Inorganic Chemistry =

- Discipline: Inorganic Chemistry
- Language: English
- Edited by: Preeti Vashi

Publication details
- History: 1998–present
- Publisher: Wiley-VCH on behalf of Chemistry Europe
- Frequency: Weekly
- Open access: Hybrid
- Impact factor: 2.551 (2021)

Standard abbreviations
- ISO 4: Eur. J. Inorg. Chem.

Indexing
- CODEN: EJICFO
- ISSN: 1434-1948 (print); 1099-0682 (web)

Links
- Journal homepage

The European Journal of Inorganic Chemistry is a weekly peer-reviewed scientific journal covering inorganic, organometallic, bioinorganic, and solid-state chemistry. It is published by Wiley-VCH on behalf of Chemistry Europe.

The journal, along with the European Journal of Organic Chemistry, was established in 1998 as the result of a merger of Chemische Berichte/Recueil, Bulletin de la Société Chimique de France, Bulletin des Sociétés Chimiques Belges, Gazzetta Chimica Italiana, Anales de Química, Chimika Chronika, Revista Portuguesa de Química, and ACH-Models in Chemistry.

According to the Journal Citation Reports, the journal has a 2021 impact factor of 2.551.

== See also ==
- List of chemistry journals
- European Journal of Organic Chemistry
