= Catalan Institute of Nanoscience and Nanotechnology =

Research institute in Catalonia

- Established: 2013
- Field of research: Nanoscience and Nanotechnology
- Director: Prof. Pablo Ordejón
- Staff: 210
- Location: Barcelona, Spain

The Catalan Institute of Nanoscience and Nanotechnology (ICN2) is a Spanish foundation for interdisciplinary research in nanoscience and nanotechnology. Located on the campus of the Autonomous University of Barcelona (UAB), the institute also offers education programs, training to researchers and services to industry and the scientific community. It is integrated in the research centers organization of the Generalitat de Catalunya (CERCA).

The institute is governed by a Board of Trustees, formed by: the Generalitat de Catalunya, the Consejo Superior de Investigaciones Científicas (CSIC) and the Universidad Autónoma de Barcelona (UAB). It has been a Severo Ochoa center of excellence in 2014 and 2018.

== History ==
The ICN2 was founded in 2003 as "Instituto Catalán de Nanotecnología" (ICN). In 2006 began the collaboration with the Consejo Superior de Investigaciones Científicas (CSIC). It was then that the Catalan Institute of Nanoscience and Nanotechnology (ICN2) was created. Since 2012 the center has been managed by Pablo Ordejón.

In 2011 CSIC members joined the ICN's board of trustees. In 2013 the ICN adopted its current name, Catalan Institute of Nanoscience and Nanotechnology (ICN2). A new headquarters was built on the UAB campus and the building was inaugurated in 2014.

== Research ==
Research at the ICN2 is carried out by the following multi-disciplinary research groups:

Research Group	Main research lines	Group Leader
Advanced Electron Nanoscopy	Advanced techniques and related spectroscopies (EELS, EDX and CL) for nanotechnology and materials science.	Jordi Arbiol (ICREA)
Advanced Electronic Materials & Devices	Fundamental electronic and electrochemical phenomena of novel materials, such as graphene and other 2D's. Preparation (CVD) of high quality films of 2D materials.	Jose Antonio Garrido (ICREA)
Atomic manipulation and spectroscopy	Hybrid interfaces for spintronics including metal-organic networks on metals and topological insulators. Graphene-based nanostructures.	Aitor Mugarza (ICREA)
Inorganic Nanoparticles	Synthetic strategies for the production of complex nanoparticles. Functionalization with specific relevant (bio)molecules. Study of their physicochemical and fundamental properties.	Víctor F. Puntes (ICREA)
Magnetic nanostructures	Exchange coupling in bi-magnetic core/shell nanoparticles and nanostructures. Magnetoplasmonic effects. Novel magnetic and structural characterisation tools for nanoparticles.	Josep Nogués (ICREA)
Nanobioelectronics and biosensors	Innovative sensing technologies. Development of novel nanostructured, nanochannel flexible platforms based on nanoimprinting and ink-jet printing technologies.	Arben Merkoçi (ICREA)
Nanobiosensors and bioanalytical applications	Plasmonic and nanoplasmonic biosensors. Silicon photonic biosensors. Nanomechanical biosensors. Bioanalytical applications.	Laura M. Lechuga
Nanomedicine	Clinical translation of bioelectronic and microfluidic devices. Nanomaterials as vector systems for therapeutic and diagnostic applications. Development of graphene and 2D materials in medicine.	Kostas Kostarelos
Nanostructured functional materials	Future and emerging technologies. Biomaterials. Sustainability.	Daniel Ruiz-Molina
Nanostructured materials for photovoltaic energy	Organic, Hybrid, Dye-sensitised, Halide Perovskite and All-oxide Solar Cells: materials synthesis and characterisation and complete device fabrication. Synthesis of metal oxides.	Mónica Lira-Cantú
Novel energy-oriented materials	Hybrid electrode materials for supercapacitors and hybrid energy storage devices. Cathode materials with fractal granularity for Li-ion batteries based on LiFePO4. Nanofluids.	Pedro Gómez-Romero
Oxide nanophysics	Flexoelectricity and Piezoelectricity. Fundamentals and devices. Electronic and electromechanical properties of oxide thin films. Domain wall nanoelectronics. Ferroelectrics, multiferroics, metal-insulator transitions.	Gustau Catalán (ICREA)
Phononic and photonic nanostructures	Nanophononics and Nanophotonics. Nanofabrication. Nanometrology. Oxide-based Nanostructures.	Clivia M. Sotomayor Torres (ICREA)
Physics and engineering of nanodevices	Novel nanodevice structures and nanofabrication methods. Physical properties of materials at the nanoscale and their technological relevance. Spin and thermal transport.	Sergio Valenzuela (ICREA)
Supramolecular nanochemistry and materials	Nanoporous Metal-Organic Frameworks and related nanoparticles. Micro- and nano-encapsulation technologies towards the design of new multifunctional nanocarriers.	Daniel Maspoch (ICREA)
Theoretical and computational nanoscience	Quantum transport phenomena in Graphene. Spin dynamics in Dirac Matter. Thermal properties and Thermoelectricity. Predictive Modelling and Multiscale numerical simulation.	Stephan Roche (ICREA)
Theory and simulation	Development of theoretical methods, numerical algorithms and simulation tools. SIESTA & TRANSIESTA codes. First Principles of nanoscale simulations. Novel physical properties in 2D materials.	Pablo Ordejón
Ultrafast dynamics in nanoscale systems	Ultrafast phenomena on two-dimensional, layered materials, and hybrid Van der Waals heterostructures. Thermal management, thermoelectrics, photodetection and quantum technologies.	Klaas-Jan Tielrooij

The ICN2 has a Research Support Division with three units: instrumentation, electron microscopy, nanomaterials growth.

It has runs training programs for researchers in nanotechnology including studentships, doctoral and post-doctoral positions. It also provides custom training courses for technicians, R&D personnel and administrative personnel.

The Institute promotes the commercial exploitation and dissemination of the results of its research, through collaboration with local and international companies. l. The institute is also involved in spinoff companies and provides a range of facilities and services to support research and innovation carried out by its partners.

== Organization & Leadership ==
The ICN2 is led by its director, Prof. Pablo Ordejón, Research is led by 18 group leaders.The ICN2's strategic research programs are reviewed and evaluated by an independent Scientific Advisory Board (SAB) made up of international scientists with experience in nanoscience and nanotechnology from the public and private sectors.

== Awards ==
In 2014, the ICN2 was accredited as a 'Severo Ochoa Centre of Excellence' by the Spanish Ministry of Economy and Competitiveness for the period 2014-2018, in recognition of the ICN2's international scientific impact, potential for attracting international talent and its contribution to the transfer and dissemination of knowledge to society. The award was renewed in 2018 for the 2018-2022 period.

== Outreach ==
ICN2 participates in educational programs at school, such as NanoEduca, and in the community with seminars and workshops that bring scientists together with business people and politicians. Its research results are published in the media. They also organize discussion forums.

== Scientific Output ==
During 2018, ICN2 researchers produced 172 indexed publications with an average impact factor of 8.86. Specifically, 136 of these articles were published in first-quartile journals, while 77 appeared in first-decile journals.
