= Chemische Berichte =

Berichte der Deutschen Chemischen Gesellschaft
- Discipline: Chemistry
- Language: German

Publication details
- History: 1868 to 1945
- Publisher: Deutsche Chemische Gesellschaft (Germany)

Standard abbreviations
- ISO 4: Ber. Dtsch. Chem. Ges.

Indexing
- CODEN: BDCGAS
- ISSN: 0365-9496

Chemische Berichte
- Discipline: Chemistry
- Language: German

Publication details
- History: 1947 to 1997
- Publisher: Wiley-VCH (Germany)

Standard abbreviations
- ISO 4: Chem. Ber.

Indexing
- CODEN: CHBEAM
- ISSN: 0009-2940

Chemische Berichte/Recueil
- Discipline: Chemistry
- Language: German and English

Publication details
- History: 1998
- Publisher: Wiley-VCH (Germany)

Standard abbreviations
- ISO 4: Chem. Ber. Recl.

Indexing
- CODEN: CHBRFW
- OCLC no.: 36290071

Chemische Berichte (usually abbreviated as Ber. or Chem. Ber.) was a German-language scientific journal of all disciplines of chemistry founded in 1868. It was one of the oldest scientific journals in chemistry, until it merged with Recueil des Travaux Chimiques des Pays-Bas to form Chemische Berichte/Recueil in 1997. Chemische Berichte/Recueil was then merged with other European journals in 1998 to form European Journal of Inorganic Chemistry.

== History ==
Founded in 1868 as Berichte der Deutschen Chemischen Gesellschaft (ISSN 0365-9631, CODEN BDCGAS), it operated under this title until 1928 (Vol. 61). The journal was then split into:

- Berichte der Deutschen Chemischen Gesellschaft, A: Vereins-Nachrichten (ISSN 0365-947X, CODEN BDCAAS), and
- Berichte der Deutschen Chemischen Gesellschaft, B: Abhandlungen (ISSN 0365-9488, CODEN BDCBAD).

Vol. 78 and 79 (1945–1946) were omitted and not published due to World War II. The journal was renamed Chemische Berichte (ISSN 0009-2940, CODEN CHBEAM) in 1947 (Vol. 80) until 1996 (Vol. 129).

In 1997, Chemische Berichte and Liebigs Annalen were merged with the Dutch journal Recueil des Travaux Chimiques des Pays-Bas to form Chemische Berichte/Recueil (CODEN CHBRFW) and Liebigs Annalen/Recueil (CODEN LIARFV).

In 1998, Chemische Berichte/Recueil merged with other European journals to form European Journal of Inorganic Chemistry, while Liebigs Annalen/Recueil and other European journals were merged to form European Journal of Organic Chemistry.
