= Liebigs Annalen =

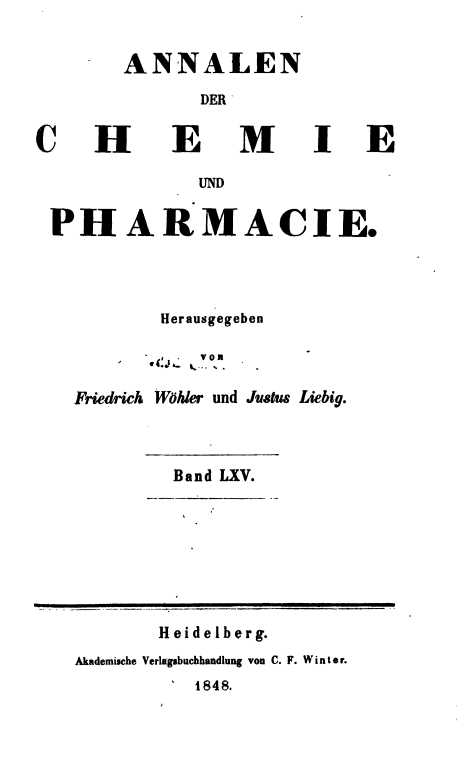
- 1848 cover of the 65th volume
- Discipline: Chemistry
- Language: German, English

Publication details
- History: 1832–1997
- Publisher: Wiley-VCH

Standard abbreviations
- ISO 4: Liebigs Ann.

Indexing
- CODEN: LACHDL
- ISSN: 0170-2041

Links
- Journal homepage

Justus Liebig's Annalen der Chemie (often cited as Liebigs Annalen) was one of the oldest and historically most important journals in the field of organic chemistry worldwide. It was established in 1832 and edited by Justus von Liebig with Friedrich Wöhler and others until Liebig's death in 1873. The journal was originally titled Annalen der Pharmacie; its name was changed to Justus Liebig's Annalen der Chemie in 1874. In its first decades of publishing, the journal was both a periodical containing news of the chemical and pharmaceutical fields and a publisher of primary research. During this time, it was noted to contain rebuttals and criticism of the works it published, inserted by Justus von Liebig during his tenure as an editor. After 1874, changes were made to editorial policies, and the journal published only completed research; later on, in the 20th century, its focus was narrowed to only print articles on organic chemistry, though it had always placed emphasis on the field. The journal was especially influential in the mid-19th century, but by the post-World War II period was considered "no longer as preeminent as it once was".

The journal has undergone mergers and changes in name throughout its history, from its inception to changes made following Liebig's death and its eventual consolidation with other journals in the late 20th century. In 1997, the journal merged with Recueil des Travaux Chimiques des Pays-Bas to form Liebigs Annalen/Recueil, and in 1998, it was absorbed by European Journal of Organic Chemistry by merger of a number of other national European chemistry journals.

== Content ==
Many chemical syntheses and discoveries were published in Liebigs Annalen. Among these were Robert Bunsen and Gustav Kirchhoff's discovery of caesium and its later isolation by Carl Setterberg, Adolf Windaus' studies on the constitution of cholesterol and vitamins for which he was awarded the 1928 Nobel prize in Chemistry, and many of Georg Wittig's publications, including the preparation of phenyllithium.

Liebigs Annalen published news on advances in chemistry and pharmacy in addition to primary research, mainly during Justus von Liebig's time as editor. From 1839 to 1855, the journal published a summary report of the advances made in chemistry for the year. One example of a news item published in the Annalen was the discovery of ether as it is used in surgical anesthesia by Henry Jacob Bigelow, which Liebig had been informed of through a letter from Edward Everett. Lothar Meyer and Dmitri Mendeleev both published their versions of the periodic table in Liebigs Annalen in 1870 and 1871, respectively, though both had published elsewhere in the years prior to their separate printings of the "full periodic system" in the Annalen. By 1957, the content of Liebigs Annalen was entirely organic chemistry.

=== Under Liebig's editorship ===
As an editor, Justus von Liebig would often promote his own work in the journal. Liebig would also publish his criticism on articles published in the journal, including attacks on theoretical frameworks of organic chemistry that were in conflict with his support of radical theory. These criticisms were later described by chemist and historian J. R. Partington in his series A History of Chemistry:

As editor of the Annalen, Liebig criticised others freely, and sometimes showed poor judgment, e.g. in his violent attack on a factual paper on hydrogen persulphide by Thenard. A paper on benzene by Mitscherlich is full of critical footnotes by Liebig, and as if this were not enough, he added a critical 'Nachtrag' and an 'Erklärung'. His criticisms of Laurent and Gerhardt (see p. 411) and of Mulder (see p. 319) exceeded all reason.

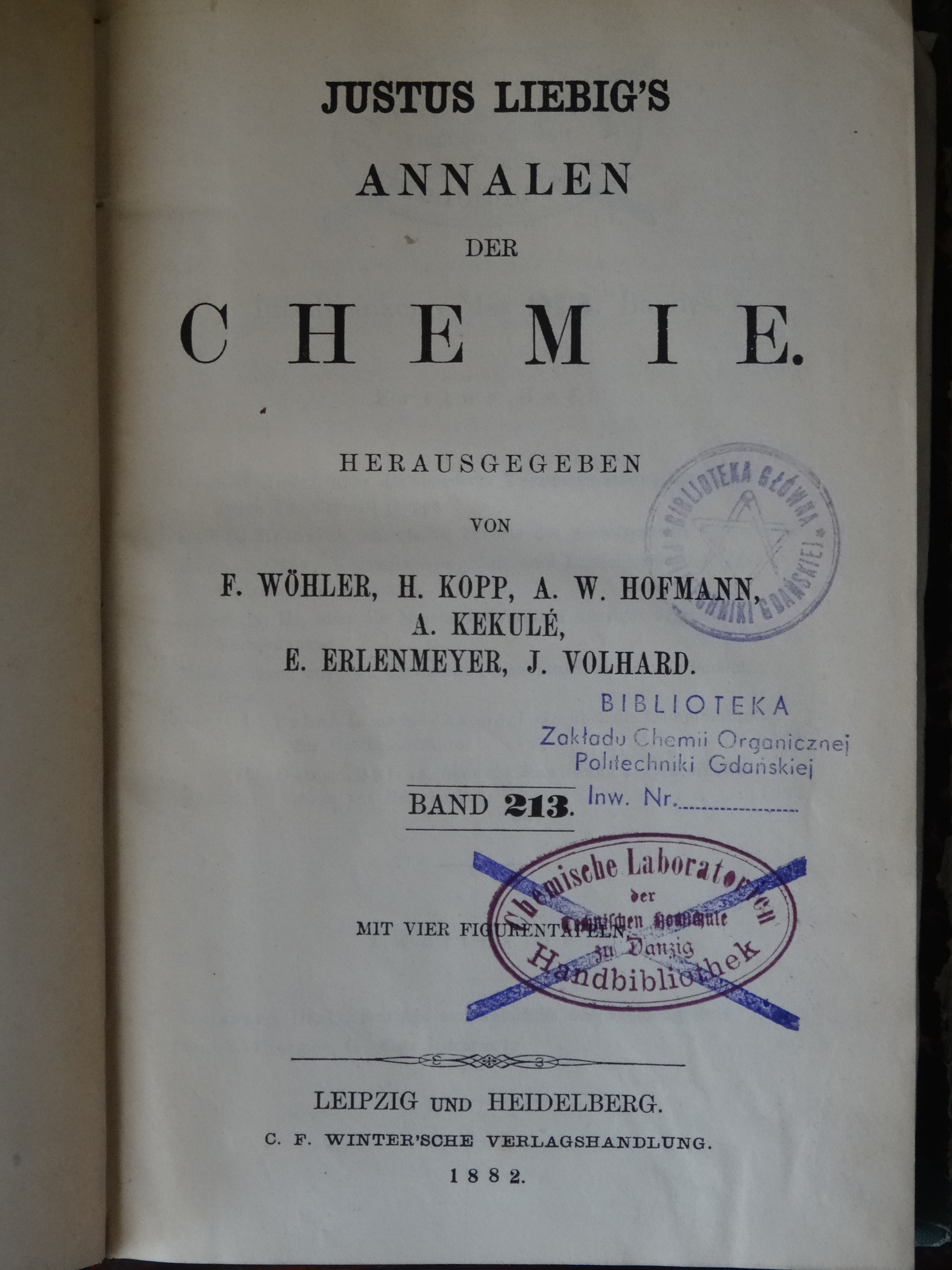
The journal as it appeared in 1882, after Liebig's death

Similarly, on Liebig and Hermann Kolbe, a contemporary organic chemist of similar reputation, J. P. Phillips of the University of Louisville Department of Chemistry wrote "...that the polemical outbursts for which Liebig and Kolbe were famous were not mere episodes in low comedy but a reasonably consistent defense of the conservative position that organic theory must develop from experiment alone." Following Liebig's death, Jacob Volhard, head of the group publishing the Annalen in 1878, altered the policies of the journal to only accept and print finished research papers not already printed elsewhere and "to exclude articles of a polemical nature".

== History ==
The history of Liebigs Annalen started with the monthly Magazin für Pharmacie und die dahin einschlagenden Wissenschaften, a work printed in Lemgo and Heidelberg (later exclusively in Heidelberg), edited by professor of pharmacy Philipp Lorenz Geiger, that Justus von Liebig joined in 1831 as co-editor. The name was changed by the end of 1831 to Magazin für Pharmacie und Experimentalkritik, in the following year merged with the Archiv der Pharmazie, then known as the Archiv des Apothekervereins im nördlichen Teutschland, edited by Rudolph Brandes. In 1834, the Neues Journal der Pharmazie fur Arzte, Apotheker und Chemiker was merged with the Annalen, resulting in a brief period wherein there were 4 editors: Liebig, Brandes, Geiger, and Johann Trommsdorff. The first volume of the journal after the merger included papers from several well-known names in chemistry, including Jöns Jacob Berzelius and Joseph Louis Gay-Lussac, not to mention Liebig himself. Brandes withdrew from the journal in 1835 due to disagreements with Liebig, going on to publish the Archiv der Pharmazie independently; Annalen der Pharmacie was renamed to Annalen der Chemie und Pharmacie on the publication of volume 33 in 1840 in an effort to be more inclusive of the related fields of research in chemistry and thus broaden the potential audience.

In 1837, Liebig left Germany for Britain to meet with the British Association for the Advancement of Science and to market his work, and around that time met with Thomas Graham and Jean-Baptiste Dumas. Upon returning to Germany, due to the perceived poor quality of the Annalen while he was away, Liebig fired his co-editors Emanuel Merck and Friedrich Mohr, making himself the sole editor of the Annalen. At this point, the journal was starting publication outside of Germany, namely in France and England. Liebig acknowledged "the cooperation" of Graham and Dumas from 1838 to 1842, but would break away from them in 1842, and remained the only editor until 1851, at which point he invited Hermann Kopp to take over management of the journal; Kopp's name would appear on the title page of the journal as editor from 1851 until his death in 1892, though several other editors, including Jacob Volhard, joined the editorial board during his tenure.

After Liebig's death in 1873, the journal's name was changed to Justus Liebig's Annalen der Chemie und Pharmazie. This name was shortened to Justus Liebig's Annalen der Chemie beginning with volume 173 in 1974, which was kept until it was merged with the Dutch journal Recueil des Travaux Chimiques des Pays-Bas in 1997. Shortly before the merger, in 1995, Liebigs Annalen started publishing articles in English. The resulting publication, titled Liebigs Annalen/Recueil, became part of the European Journal of Organic Chemistry in January 1998.

Prior to the mergers in the late 20th century, Liebigs Annalen faced difficulties due to paper shortages and reduced research publication during World War I, the deaths of several editors in the 1910s, and further publishing difficulties during World War II. For several years prior to World War II, several Nobel Prize recipients served on the editorial board, including Richard Willstätter, Adolf Windaus, Heinrich Otto Wieland, Hans Fischer and Richard Kuhn. Publications in the during- and post-war period were fewer in number and had poor paper quality due to shortages, and printing moved from Heidelberg to Munich in 1945 and to Weinheim by 1947. By the later 1950s, printing volume and quality had been brought back to pre-war averages, but by this point the journal was described as "no longer as preeminent as it once was".

=== Editors ===
The editorial board of Liebigs Annalen throughout its history has included many notable figures in German chemistry:

Editor	Tenure	Notes
Philipp Lorenz Geiger	1824-1836	
Justus von Liebig	1831-1873	Managing editor
Rudolph Brandes	1832-1835	
Johann Trommsdorff	1834-1837	
Heinrich Emanuel Merck	1836-1838	
Karl Friedrich Mohr	1837-1838	
Thomas Graham	1838-1842	
Jean-Baptiste Dumas	1838-1842	
Friedrich Wöhler	1838-1882	
Hermann Kopp	1851-1892	
Emil Erlenmeyer	1873-1909	Junior editor
Jacob Volhard	1873-1910	Junior editor, managing editor post-1878
August Wilhelm von Hofmann	1874-1892	
August Kekulé	1874-1896	
Wilhelm Rudolph Fittig	1896-1910	Succeeded Kekulé
Otto Wallach	1897-1931	
Adolf von Baeyer	1897-1917	
Emil Fischer	1907-1919	
Johannes Thiele	1910-1918	Managing editor, succeeded Volhard
Carl Graebe	1911-1927	Succeeded Erlenmeyer
Theodor Zincke	1911-1928	Succeeded Fittig
Richard Willstätter	1917-1938	Succeeded Baeyer
Wilhelm Wislicenus	1918-1922	Managing editor, succeeded Thiele
Heinrich Otto Wieland	1922-1957	
Adolf Windaus	1927-1957	
Hans Fischer	1928-1945	
Richard Kuhn	1948-1967	
Klaus Hafner	1967-2002 (Note: Continued working as an editor through the transition from Liebigs Annalen to its successor publication European Journal of Organic Chemistry.)	Editor and senior editor
Robert Temme	1979-2016	Managing editor

=== Title history ===
- Annalen der Pharmacie, 1832–1839
- Annalen der Chemie und Pharmacie, 1840–1873 (ISSN 0075-4617, CODEN JLACBF)
- Justus Liebig's Annalen der Chemie und Pharmacie, 1873–1874 (ISSN 0075-4617, CODEN JLACBF)
- Justus Liebig's Annalen der Chemie, 1874–1944 & 1947–1978 (ISSN 0075-4617, CODEN JLACBF)
- Liebigs Annalen der Chemie, 1979–1994 (ISSN 0170-2041, CODEN LACHDL)
- Liebigs Annalen, 1995–1996 (ISSN 0947-3440, CODEN LANAEM)
- Liebigs Annalen/Recueil, 1997 (ISSN 0947-3440, CODEN LIARFV)
- European Journal of Organic Chemistry, 1998+ (Print ISSN 1434-193X; eISSN 1099-0690, CODEN EJOCFK)
