= Spanish Royal Society of Chemistry =

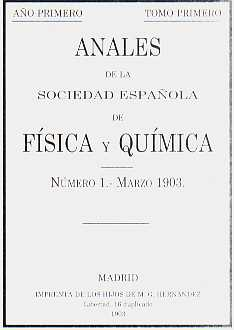
Cover of the first issue of the Annals of the Spanish Society of Physics and Chemistry, first publication of the precursor society RSEQ

The Spanish Royal Society of Chemistry (RSEQ) is a Spanish scientific society dedicated to the development and dissemination of chemistry, in its aspect of pure science and in its applications. It originated in 1980 after the split of the Spanish Royal Society of Physics and Chemistry which itself was founded in 1903.

The purpose of the RSEQ is "to facilitate the advancement and improvement of scientific activity, teaching, research and professional in the field of Chemistry and Chemical Engineering."

The RSEQ is a member of EuCheMS (European Association for Chemical and Molecular Sciences), a non-profit organization founded in 1970 that promotes cooperation between scientific societies and European techniques in the field of chemistry.

== History ==
Although the Spanish Royal Society of Chemistry (RSEQ) emerged in 1980, its history dates back to 1903, the year of the founding of the Spanish Society of Physics and Chemistry (SEFQ) and soon began publishing the journal Annals of the Spanish Society Physics and Chemistry. The number of members was 263 in the first year, professionals experimental sciences, primarily engaged in the field of chemistry.

In the 1920s, after major development and internationalization, the company incorporated at the IUPAC. In 1928, to mark the 25th anniversary of its founding, the company was honored by King Alfonso XIII with the name Royal Spanish Society of Physics and Chemistry. From this date forward, it created local branches (Sevilla, Barcelona, Madrid, Valencia) and hold biennial meetings of the Society.

In 1934, the Royal Society organized the IX International Congress of Chemistry in Madrid, attended by 1,500 chemists in all countries. At that time, the Society already had about 1400 members. After the interruption of the Spanish Civil War and its disastrous consequences, the society began to reach new heights, especially from the 60s onward, as a result of the developing policies of the time.

In the 70 territorial sections are consolidated specialized groups, such as Organic Chemistry and Biochemistry (created in 1967), and Adsorption (created in 1978). At the end of the decade it was decided to divide the society into two independent branches, the Royal Society of Chemistry (RSEQ) and Physics (RSEF). Successors of the work of the parent company held their biennial meeting in Burgos, 29 September to 3 October 1980.

In the following years the focus groups were widespread within the RSEQ, and biennial meetings continued. The publication Annals of Chemistry was divided into three series between 1980 and 1989:

- Annals of Chemistry / Series A, Physical Chemistry and Chemical Engineering, ( ISSN 0211-1330, CODEN AQSTDQ)
- Annals of Chemistry / Series B, Inorganic and Analytical Chemistry, (ISSN 0211-1349, CODEN AQSAD3)
- Annals of Chemistry / C Series, Organic Chemistry and Biochemistry (ISSN 0211-1357, CODEN AQSBD6)

From 1990 to 1995, subseries A, B and C are joined to form again Annals of Chemistry, (ISSN 1130-2283, CODEN ANQUEX). Between 1996 and 1998 the magazine changed its name to Annals of Chemistry, International Edition, (ISSN 1130-2283, CODEN AQIEFZ) and published in English during this period.

In 1998 it merged with other European publications, to edit together several magazines in English, but the tradition of publishing in Spanish with the founding in 1999 of continuing Annals of the Spanish Royal Society of Chemistry (Annals RSEQ), ISSN 1575-3417, quarterly.

== Publications ==
Since 1999, Annals of the Spanish Royal Society of Chemistry, ISSN 1575-3417, is published quarterly. This journal is a continuation of classical Annals of Chemistry, which was integrated into a consortium of European magazines along with Acta Chimica Hungarica, Models in Chemistry, Bulletin des Sociétés Chimiques Belges, Bulletin of Société Chimique de France, Chemische Berichte, Chimika Chronika, Gazzetta Chimica Italiana, Liebigs Annalen, Polish Journal of Chemistry, Recueil des Travaux des Pays-Bas Chimiques and Revista Portuguesa de Química.

The Association of European Journals in partnership with Wiley-VCH publishes several magazines: Chemistry - A European Journal, European Journal of Inorganic Chemistry, European Journal of Organic Chemistry, ChemBioChem, ChemMedChem and ChemSusChem.

The RSEQ is also co-editor of the journal Analytical and Bioanalytical Chemistry (published by Springer ) and Physical Chemistry Chemical Physics (PCCP), published by the Royal Society of Chemistry.

The society also periodically publishes a newsletter and other publications without fixed periodicity.

== See also ==
Anales de Química
