= Albert J. R. Heck =

Dutch chemist

Albert J.R. Heck
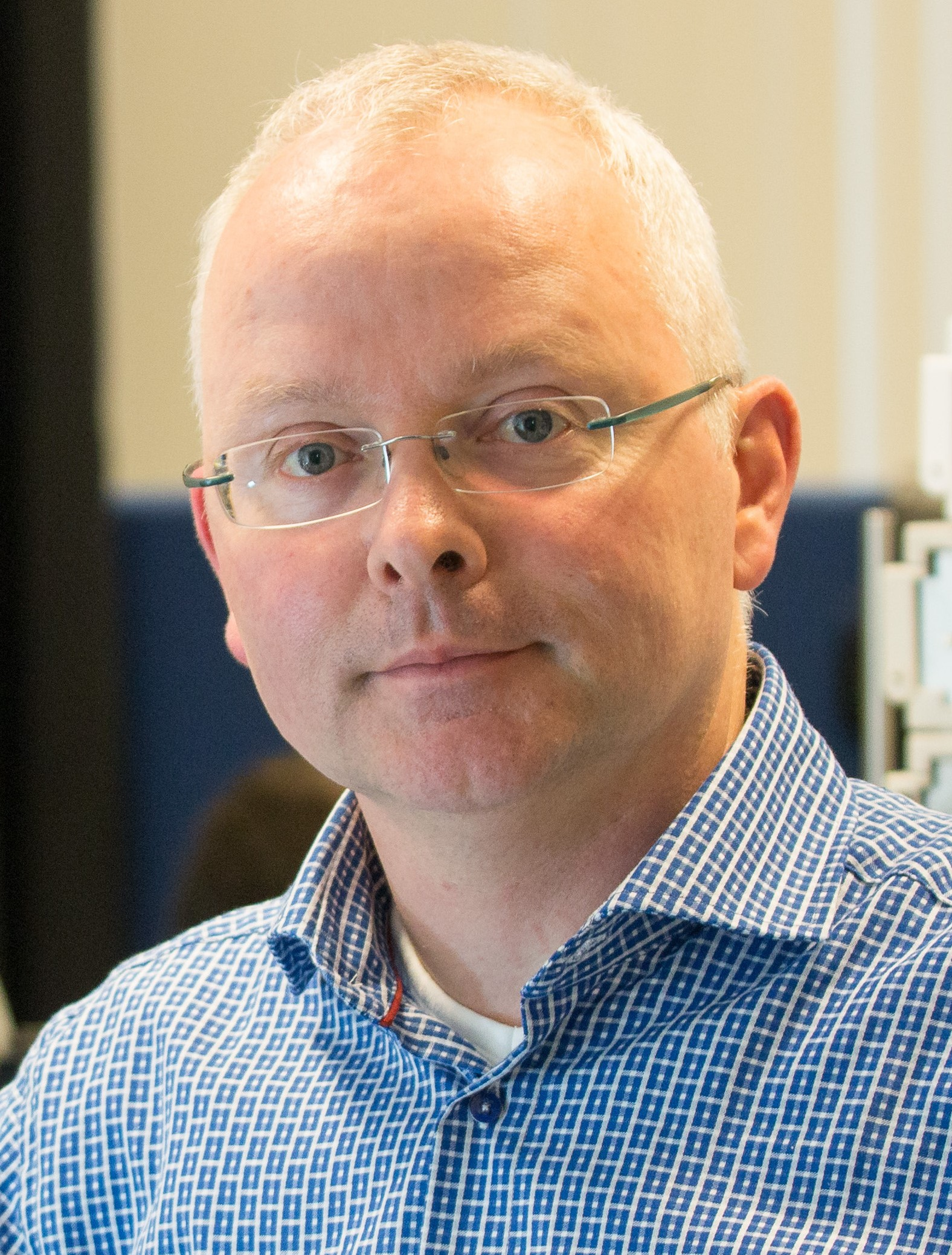
- Born: 25 November 1964 (age 61); Goes, The Netherlands
- Education: University of Amsterdam
- Known for: Proteomics, Native Mass Spectrometry
- Awards: Descartes-Huygens Prize (2006); Spinoza Prize (2017); Sir Hans Krebs Medal (2018)
- Scientific career
- Fields: Physics, Chemistry, Biology
- Workplaces: Utrecht University, University of Warwick, Stanford University, University of Amsterdam
- Doctoral advisor: Nico M. M. Nibbering

Albert J.R. Heck (born 25 November 1964) is a Dutch scientist and professor at Utrecht University, the Netherlands in the field of mass spectrometry and proteomics. He is known for his work on technologies to study proteins in their natural environment, with the aim to understand their biological function. Albert Heck was awarded the Spinoza Prize in 2017, the highest scientific award in the Netherlands.

== Biography ==
Albert Heck was born in Goes, Netherlands. He studied chemistry at the VU University in Amsterdam, and received his PhD degree from the University of Amsterdam in 1993. After a postdoctoral period at Stanford University in the lab of Richard Zare and Sandia National Laboratories (Livermore) he became a postdoctoral fellow and later lecturer at University of Warwick.

In 1998, he accepted a chair at Utrecht University as head of the Biomolecular Mass Spectrometry and Proteomics Group. His group is part of the Departments of Chemistry and Pharmaceutical Sciences of the Faculty of Science. From 2006 until 2012 Heck was scientific director of the Bijvoet Centre for Biomolecular Research, and from 2015 to 2018 scientific director of the Utrecht Institute for Pharmaceutical Science at Utrecht University. In 2017, he received a Distinguished Faculty professorship of Utrecht University.

== Research ==
The research of Albert Heck is focused on the development and use of mass spectrometry to study all cellular proteins. Within his research group, there are three main lines of research, improvement of instrumentation and analytical methods, proteomics and mass spectrometry based structural biology, including native protein mass spectrometry and cross-linking mass spectrometry.

Albert Heck is regarded as one of the pioneers of native mass spectrometry. Among the complexes that he studied using native mass spectrometry are intact viruses of up to 18 megadalton, ribosomes, antibodies in complex with their antigens or proteins of the complement system. He has developed, in collaboration with Alexander Makarov mass spectrometers with extended mass ranges, specifically suited for the analyses of very large protein complexes, which were later commercialized by the company ThermoFisher Scientific as the Orbitrap EMR and UHMR.

In proteomics, Heck is most renowned for his work on quantitative proteomics, interactomics, and the analysis of post-translational modification of proteins using mass spectrometry, with a focus on protein phosphorylation and protein glycosylation. This started with the introduction of the material TiO_{2} as a method for the targeted analysis of phosphopeptides in 2004. The methods developed by Heck have been adopted by many scientists in other fields, to study how protein expression and phosphorylation are regulated in human cells and tissues by different biological processes and disease states.

Additionally, he advocated the use of complementary proteases in shot-gun proteomics and he introduced and developed novel peptide fragmentation strategies to elucidate site specific post-translational modifications. The latter improves determination of peptide and protein sequence information, which is particular helpful for the analysis of glycopeptides and HLA antigens. Heck also contributed to the field of cross-linking mass spectrometry, through proteome wide cross-linking experiments, and the development of novel fragmentation methods and the software suite XlinkX.

Albert Heck is closely involved in coordinating access to proteomics infrastructures in the Netherlands and in Europe. Since 2003 Heck is scientific director of the Netherlands Proteomics Centre. From 2011 to 2015 he was coordinator of PRIME-XS, and since 2019 he coordinates EPIC-XS, both collaborative projects funded by the European Union to enable access to proteomics technology for researchers throughout Europe.

== Honours and awards ==
Heck received numerous awards and prizes for his scientific contributions. He received The KNCV golden medal in 2001, the Descartes-Huygens Prize from the Académie de Sciences in 2006, the Life Science Award of the German Mass Spectrometry Society in 2010, the Discovery Award in Proteomic Sciences from the Human Proteome Organization in 2013 and the UePA Pioneer Proteomics Award in 2014.

Since 2014 he is a member of the European Molecular Biology Organization. In 2014, Heck was elected a member of the Royal Netherlands Academy of Arts and Sciences. The American Chemical Society honoured Albert Heck with the 'Frank H. Field and Joe L. Franklin Award for Outstanding Achievements in Mass Spectrometry' in 2015.

In 2017, he was awarded the Spinoza Prize, the highest scientific distinction in the Netherlands for his "major contribution to the worldwide breakthrough of systematically mapping all proteins in human cells and their biological functions by means of mass spectrometry".

In 2018, he received the Sir Hans Krebs Medal of the Federation of European Biochemical Societies (FEBS) and the Thomson Medal Award of the International Mass Spectrometry Society (IMSC).
