= Descartes–Huygens Prize =

French–Dutch scientific prize

The Descartes–Huygens Prize is an annual scientific prize created in 1995 by the French and the Dutch governments, and attributed to two scientists of international level, a French one chosen by the Koninklijke Nederlandse Akademie van Wetenschappen and a Dutch one chosen by the Académie des sciences, to reward their work and their contributions to the French–Dutch cooperation.

The prize is named in memory of French scientist René Descartes (1596–1650) and Dutch scientist Christiaan Huygens (1629–1695), who spent several years working in each other's country.

== Attribution of the prize ==
The prize consists of an amount of 46000 euros (€23000 for each recipient), contributed by the KNAW, the French Embassy in the Netherlands and the French Minister of Higher Education and Research. It is intended to finance one or more research visits in the Netherlands or in France. It is attributed by juries presided by one of the participating Academies (Koninklijke Nederlandse Akademie van Wetenschappen, Académie des sciences and Académie des sciences morales et politiques), alternating between the following disciplines: natural sciences, life sciences, human and social sciences.

== List of the Dutch laureates ==
- 1995 - Jook Walraven, physicist
- 1996 - H. Pannekoek
- 1997 - Olga Weijers, literary scholar
- 1998 - Wim van Saarloos, physicist
- 1999 - Jan Hoeijmakers, geneticist
- 2000 - Theo Verbeek, philosopher
- 2001 - Pieter Timotheus (Tim) de Zeeuw, astronomer
- 2002 - Harry Struijker-Boudier, pharmacologist
- 2003 - not assigned to Dutch scientist
- 2004 - Hans Bots, historian
- 2005 - Anne-Jans Faber, physicist
- 2006 - Albert Heck, chemist
- 2007 - Pim den Boer, historian
- 2008 - Stefan Vandoren, physicist
- 2009 - Arthur Wilde, cardiovascular researcher
- 2010 - Willem Frijhoff, historian
- 2011 - Ieke Moerdijk, mathematician
- 2012 - Harry Heijnen, cell biologist
- 2013 - Caroline van Eck, art historian
- 2014 - Willem Vos, physicist
- 2015 - Joost Gribnau, epigeneticist
- 2016 - Louis Sicking, historian
- 2017 - Daniël Vanmaekelbergh, material scientist
- 2018 - Katell Lavéant, literary scholar
- 2019 - Lex Kaper, astronomer
- 2020 - Rampal Etienne, evolutionary ecologist
- 2021 - Maike Hansen, biophysician

== List of the French laureates ==
- 1995 - Michel Devoret, physicist
- 1996 - Denis Escande
- 1997 - Robert Muchembled, historian
- 1998 - Philippe Sautet, chemist
- 1999 - Philippe Devaux
- 2000 - Virginie Guiraudon, political scientist
- 2001 - Bernard Meunier, chemist
- 2002 - Isabelle Olivieri, biologist
- 2003 - Hamida Demirdache, linguist
- 2004 - Marie-Paule Pileni, physical chemist
- 2005 - not assigned to French scientist
- 2006 - Hubert Vaudry, endocrinologist
- 2007 - Catherine Secretan, philosopher
- 2008 - Pierre Braunstein, chemist
- 2009 - Marc Humbert, pulmonary researcher
- 2010 - François Héran, social demographer
- 2011 - François Hammer, astronomer
- 2012 - Graça Raposo, biologist
- 2013 - Bénédicte Fauvarque-Cosson, jurist
- 2014 - Ludwik Leibler, physicist
- 2015 - Benoit Viollet, molecular physiologist
- 2016 - Olivier l'Haridon, behavioural economist
- 2017 - Manuel Bibes, physicist
- 2018 - Marine Cotte, art conservation researcher
- 2019 - Julien Barc, cardiovascular researcher
- 2020 - Halima Mouhib, physicist
- 2021 - Charles-Édouard Levillain, historian
