= Anne-Marie Caminade =

French chemist

- Education: Toulouse III - Paul Sabatier University
- Scientific career
- Workplaces: Saarland University; French National Centre for Scientific Research
- Thesis: Stabilisation par complexation d'entites phosphorees de basse coordinence (1988)

Anne-Marie Caminade is a French chemist who is Director of Research Exceptional Class at the French National Centre for Scientific Research. Her research considers dendrimers and heterochemistry. She was awarded the 2021 Société chimique de France Achille le Bel Grand Prize.

== Early life and education ==
Caminade was a doctoral researcher at Toulouse III - Paul Sabatier University. She investigated the oxidation of unsaturated bonds, including the carbon – carbon double bond (C = C), C = P and P = P. Her research considered the stabilisation of low coordinate phosphorus. She moved to Saarland University as a postdoctoral fellow in the laboratory of Michael Veith.

== Research and career ==
Caminade's research involves the chemistry of phosphorus. In particular, she is interested in hydrides, macrocells, cryptants and hyperbranched polymers. She has shown that the biological properties of dendrimers are influenced by their internal structures. By incorporating phosphorus into functionalised dendrimers (where phosphorus atoms are included at every branching point) and manipulating the internal structure, Caminade has shown them to be useful for anti-inflammatory medications and anti-cancer treatments.

In 2006 Caminade was appointed leader of the French National Centre for Scientific Research “Molecular and supramolecular heterochemistry” team.

== Awards and honours ==
- 1988 Alexander von Humboldt Foundation Fellow
- 1989 French National Centre for Scientific Research Bronze medal
- 2006 Société chimique de France Organic Chemistry Award
- 2011 Appointed to the advisory board of the Chemical Society Reviews
- 2021 Société chimique de France Achille le Bel Grand Prize

Caminade was awarded the Société chimique de France Achille le Bel Grand Prize for her contributions to dendrimers and the application of dendrimers in catalysis.

== Selected publications ==
- J P Majoral; Anne-Marie Caminade (1 March 1999). "Dendrimers containing heteroatoms (si, p, B, ge, or bi)". Chemical Reviews. 99 (3): 845–880. doi:10.1021/cr970414j. ISSN 0009-2665. PMID 11749433. Wikidata Q59439497.
- Anne-Marie Caminade; Régis Laurent; Jean-Pierre Majoral (11 November 2005). "Characterization of dendrimers". Advanced Drug Delivery Reviews. 57 (15): 2130–2146. doi:10.1016/j.addr.2005.09.011. ISSN 0169-409X. PMID 16289434. Wikidata Q33227244.
- Nathalie Launay; Anne-Marie Caminade; Roger Lahana; Jean-Pierre Majoral (2 September 1994). "A General Synthetic Strategy for Neutral Phosphorus-Containing Dendrimers". Angewandte Chemie International Edition. 33 (1516): 1589–1592. doi:10.1002/anie.199415891. ISSN 1433-7851. Wikidata Q59439552.

=== Books ===
- Phosphorus dendrimers in biology and nanomedicine : synthesis, characterization, and properties. Anne-Marie Caminade, Cédric-Olivier Turrin, J.-P. Majoral. Singapore. 2018. ISBN 978-1-315-11085-1. OCLC 1019662595.
- Dendrimers : towards catalytic, material and biomedical uses. Anne-Marie Caminade. Chichester, West Sussex, U.K.: Wiley. 2011. ISBN 978-1-119-97653-0. OCLC 755702249.
