= Bernard Meunier =

French chemist (born 1947)

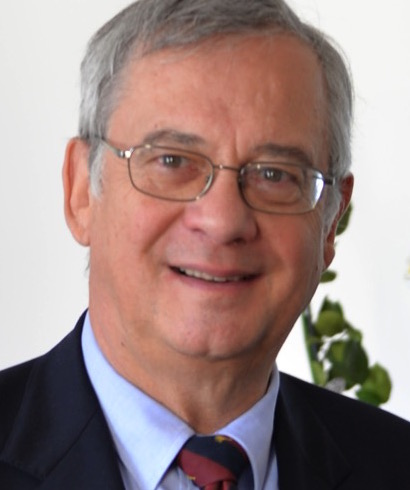
Bernard Meunier

Bernard Meunier (born 11 March 1947) is a French chemist and academic. He has been a member of the Académie des sciences since 1999.

== Career ==
After a doctorate at the University of Montpellier in November 1971 under the supervision of Robert Corriu, he obtained a state doctorate at the University of Paris-Sud in Orsay in June 1977 (with Hugh Felkin as thesis supervisor).

After a post-doctoral fellowship at Oxford University (September 1977 - August 1978) he joined the CNRS Coordination Chemistry Laboratory in Toulouse in September 1979. He joined the CNRS in January 1973 in Gif-sur-Yvette at the CNRS Institute of Natural Substances Chemistry, where he rose through all levels to become Director of Research specialising in oxidation chemistry, particularly in the field of biology and therapeutic chemistry (antitumours, antiparasites and regulators of copper homeostasis in Alzheimer's disease).

From 1993 to 2006, he was associate professor at the École Polytechnique. He was appointed President of the CNRS on 20 October 2004, a position he held until his resignation on 5 January 2006. He has been Director of Research Emeritus at the CNRS since September 2012 and Visiting Professor at the Guangdong University of Technology (China) since the same date.

He was invited professor at the Collège de France (2014-1015) on the Innovation Chair supported by the Liliane Bettencourt Foundation.

== Distinctions ==
=== Prizes ===
- Silver medal from the CNRS in 1991 Clavel-Lespieau
- Prize of the Académie des sciences in 1997
- Descartes-Huygens Prize in 2001
- Gay-Lussac Humboldt Prize in 2002
- Achille-Le-Bel Grand Prize of the Société chimique de France in 2007
- Elected on 11 December 2012 as Vice-President of the Académie des sciences for the period 2013-2014
- Elected on 18 November 2014 as President of the Académie des sciences for the period 2015-2016
- Prize of the Cercle d'Oc (Toulouse) in 2015

=== Honours ===
- Member of the Académie des Sciences since 22 November 1999
- Correspondant member of the Académie des sciences inscriptions et belles lettres of Toulouse (Science Class) in 2001
- Foreign member of the Polish Academy of Sciences since 2005
- Full member of the Académie des sciences, inscriptions et belles lettres of Toulouse (Science Class) in 2009
- Associate member of the Académie national de Pharmacie since 4 December 2013
- Visiting professor at the Collège de France for the year 2014-2015 (Liliane Bettencourt Chair of Technological Innovation). His course is entitled "Therapeutic innovation: developments and trends"

=== Décorations ===
- Officier of the Légion d'honneur. He was promoted to officier by decree on April 3, 2015. He was Chevalier on November 14, 2006.

== Publications ==
- L'homme oublié du canal de Panama, Adolphe Godin de Lépinay, CNRS Éditions, Paris, 2018, ISBN 978-2-271-09516-9
- Chimique, vous osez dire chimique?, CNRS Éditions, Paris, 2022, ISBN 978-2-271-14167-5
- L'insoutenable dette publique de la France, Éditions l'Harmattan, Paris, 2024 ISBN 978-2-336-45829-8

== Sources ==
- Bernard Meunier on the CNRS website
