= Bijvoet Centre for Biomolecular Research =

Dutch research institute

- Motto: Discovering the Molecular Basis of Life
- Established: 1988
- Scientific Director: prof. dr. Friedrich Förster
- Faculty: ~30
- Staff: ~150
- Budget: ~10 M€ per annum
- Address: Padualaan 8, Utrecht, The Netherlands
- Location: Utrecht University, Utrecht, The Netherlands
- Coordinates: 52.0855°N 5.1692°E
- Interactive map of Bijvoet Centre for Biomolecular Research
- Website: www.uu.nl/science/bijvoet

The Bijvoet Centre for Biomolecular Research is a research institute at Utrecht University. The Bijvoet Centre performs research on the relation between the structure and function of biomolecules, including proteins and lipids, which play a role in biological processes such as regulation, interaction and recognition. The Bijvoet Centre houses advanced infrastructures for the analysis of proteins and other biomolecules using NMR, X-ray crystallography, electron microscopy and mass spectrometry. The institute is named after famous Dutch chemist Johannes Martin Bijvoet, who worked at Utrecht University.

== History ==
Utrecht University and the Netherlands Foundation for Chemical Research (SON, which later became the Chemical Sciences division of NWO, the Netherlands Organisation for Scientific Research) founded the Bijvoet Centre for Biomolecular Research as a joint research institute on March 25, 1988. The goal was to create a centre for research and expertise in structural biology with an internationally recognized academic staff and an advanced instrumental and computational infrastructure, with the original task to "conduct research into the molecular structure and reactivity of chemically and biologically important, medium-sized molecules and new methods to analyze them".

When the institute was founded, it received 8.5 million Dutch guilder (approximately 3.9 million Euro) for new equipment that would contribute to societally important areas such as pharmacochemistry and biotechnology. Among the first technology to be added to the institute, was equipment for in vivo NMR studies (which nowadays is mainly known as MRI) for animal studies. The official opening of the institute was on October 27, 1989, on occasion of which a symposium was organized, with Nobel prize winner Hartmut Michel giving a keynote lecture.

Originally, the institute consisted of four groups focussing on different aspects of biomolecular research: NMR Spectroscopy, Crystal- and Structural Chemistry, Biomembranes and Modelsystems and Bio-organic Chemistry of Glycoconjugates. Since that time, the institute has evolved and diversified and, as of 2013, consist of seven research groups at Utrecht University.

== Research ==
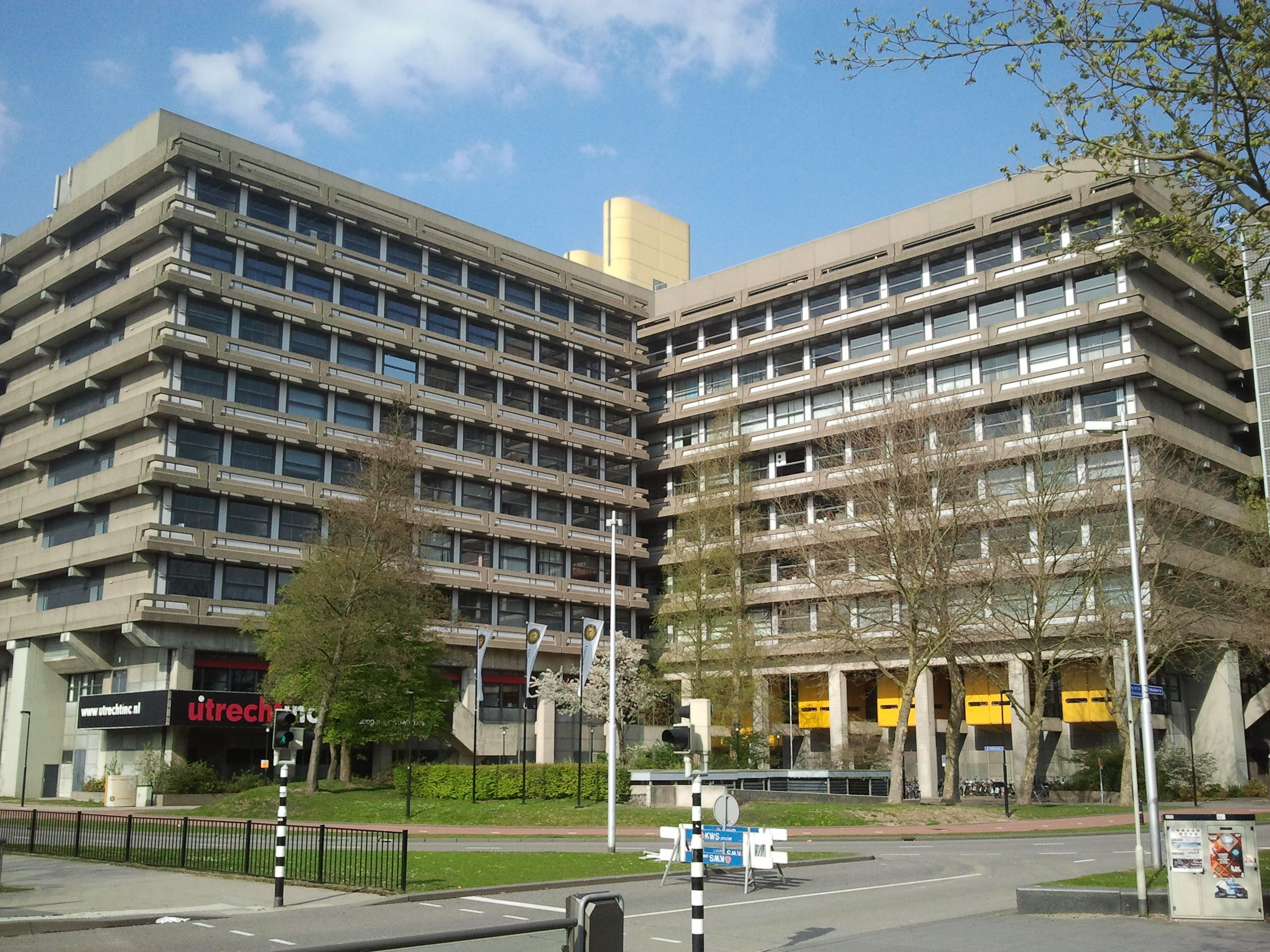
The Hugo R. Kruytbuilding at Utrecht University houses part of the research groups of the Bijvoet Centre.

The Bijvoet Centre has a staff of around 150 people, including about 10 full professors, 20 senior researchers, 50 postdocs and 50 PhD students.

The general theme of the research in the Bijvoet Centre is understanding how biomolecules function in the human body and in life in general and how the processes and interactions between biomolecules in living cells are affected in patients. This includes, for example, research to understand the cause and potential therapeutic approaches for a disease like cystic fibrosis, which is caused by misfolding of the protein CFTR when it is mutated due to a genetic defect. Another example is the development of so-called nanobullets, which are small antibody fragments, based on the single-chain antibodies found in llamas to target chemotherapeutics directly to cancer cells in a cancer patient.

Two previous scientific directors of the institute, prof. dr. Piet Gros and prof. dr. Albert Heck, both have received the NWO Spinoza Prize, in 2010 and 2017, respectively.

The institute also has technological expertise that allows for the development of novel technology to study biomolecules, like the analysis of proteins inside cells using NMR spectroscopy, novel methods for the high-throughput, proteomics based analysis of protein phosphorylation and the development, together with the company Thermo Fisher Scientific, of a new mass spectrometer that allows the analysis of intact protein complexes, including therapeutic antibodies. The centre also works on the simulation of the interactions between proteins and their interaction with drugs. To be able to predict the effect these molecules have on each other's structure, Grid computing has been used for these simulations.

== Education ==
The Bijvoet Centre hosts a large number of both Dutch and foreign PhD, master and bachelor level students with backgrounds in Chemistry, Pharmacy, Biology, Biomedical Sciences and related fields. All research groups provide education and research training programs for master level and PhD level students and, since 1992, the educational programme for PhD students of the Bijvoet Centre has been accredited by the Royal Netherlands Academy of Arts and Sciences.

In 2012, the Bijvoet Centre was the first institute in the Life Sciences in Europe to receive the prestigious Innovative Doctoral Programme grant from the Marie Curie Initial Training Network programme of the 7th Framework Programme of the European Union.

== Facilities ==
The Bijvoet Centre has leading infrastructures in protein mass spectrometry, electron microscopy, high-resolution NMR spectroscopy and X-ray crystallography to analyze the structure of biomolecules and the centre participates in the European ESFRI project Instruct for integrated structural biology. Since 2005, the research group of prof. dr. Albert J.R. Heck in the centre is the host of the Netherlands Proteomics Centre, and in 2012 the institute received funding to continue their efforts in proteomics as part of the Dutch National Roadmap for Research Infrastructures. Among the extensive NMR facilities available at the institute is also a unique solid state DNP-NMR spectrometer. In 2012 the institute acquired funding to obtain one of the world's first 1.2 GHz NMR spectrometers, as part of the uNMR-NL project, coordinated by prof. Marc Baldus and funded by the Netherlands Organisation for Scientific Research (NWO) with 18.5M Euro, to establish a national infrastructure for ultra-high field NMR spectroscopy, a joined initiative between Utrecht University, the Radboud University Nijmegen, Wageningen University, Leiden University, Eindhoven University of Technology and the Dutch public-private partnership COAST for the analytical sciences. On November 5, 2015, Dutch state secretary Sander Dekker officially opened the new national NMR facility at the Bijvoet Centre.

== Bijvoet Medal ==
The Bijvoet Centre awards the Bijvoet Medal to scientists with an outstanding contribution to furthering the fields of biomolecular chemistry and/or structural biology. Previous recipients of the Bijvoet Medal include Hartmut Michel, Matthias Mann, Nicolaas Bloembergen, Kurt Wüthrich, Ivano Bertini as well as former scientific director Hans Vliegenthart.

== Scientific Directors ==
Since the Bijvoet Centre was founded, the following people have served as scientific director of the institute:

- 2023-now : Friedrich Förster
- 2019-2023 : Alexandre Bonvin
- 2016-2019: Marc Baldus
- 2012-2016: Piet Gros
- 2006-2011: Albert J.R. Heck
- 2000-2006: Rob Kaptein
- 1988-2000: Hans Vliegenthart
