= NBPP =

NBPP may refer to:

- New Black Panther Party, American Black nationalist organization
- Netherlands Bioinformatics for Proteomics Platform, joint initiative of the Netherlands Bioinformatics Centre and the Netherlands Proteomics Centre
