= Philippe Sautet =

French chemist (born 1961)

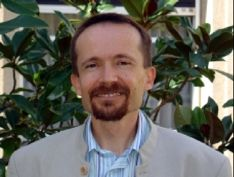
Philippe Sautet, Member of the French Academy of sciences

Philippe Sautet (born 8 May 1961 in Salon-de-Provence, France) is a French chemist. He was elected to the French Academy of sciences on 30 November 2010. He was a research director at the CNRS and works in the chemistry laboratory of the École normale supérieure de Lyon where he devoted a large part of his scientific activity to molecular modelling. He is currently a professor at the University of California, Los Angeles.

== Biography ==
Philippe Sautet is an engineer from the École polytechnique (Paris). He prepared his thesis at the University of Paris (Orsay) from 1985 to 1988 under the supervision of Odile Eisenstein. He was then a researcher at the CNRS in the Institut de Recherche sur la Catalyse (Villeurbanne, France) from 1988 to 1995, then Visiting Scientist at Lawrence Berkeley Laboratory (Berkeley, California) from 1991 to 1992. Upon his return from the United States, he was a lecturer and then professor at the École Polytechnique from 1993 to 2005. He then took over the management of UMR 5182 (Chemistry Laboratory of the École normale supérieure de Lyon, France) between 2003 and 2010. This is a research team of 80 people. He is also Director of the Institut de Chimie de Lyon, FR CNRS 3023 (1,000 people) since 2007.

== Scientific works ==
Philippe Sautet specialises on the theory of heterogeneous catalysis. The study of surfaces also contributes to the current development of nanotechnologies. He was interested in electronic structures at the solid gas interface, modeling of the elementary stages of heterogeneous catalysis and tunnel microscopy.

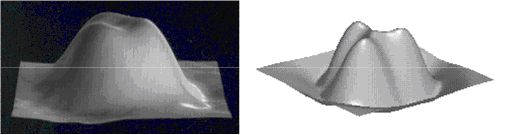
An image of benzene by tunneling microscopy: on the left, the experimental image; on the right, the calculated image

An image of benzene by tunneling microscopy: on the left, the experimental image; on the right, the calculated image.

He was responsible for the first simulation of a tunneling microscope image for an adsorbed molecule and the first demonstration of the capabilities of the simulation method developed.

In 1998, he published one of the first reactivity studies in heterogeneous catalysis by periodic DFT calculation. This work helps to understand the difference in reactivity between palladium and rhodium.

He is then the author of the determination of the nature of the active site for silver epoxidation. He then demonstrated the presence of a thin layer of oxide under reaction conditions.

He is studying for the first time the adsorption of a chiral molecule on a metal surface, thus showing the establishment of an asymmetric 2D network and its implications for enantioselective heterogeneous catalysis.

He published the first paper on gamma alumina surface modeling under realistic hydration conditions and determined the nature of the surface as a function of the pre-treatment temperature.

He then comes to model small aggregates of gold deposited on oxides. He can then study the nucleation sites.

He then succeeds in making a complete mechanistic study of the regioselectivity of a hydrogenation reaction on a polyfunctional molecule. This makes it possible to understand the key role of the desorption step of the partially hydrogenated product on selectivity.

At the same time, he performed the first modeling of organometallic complexes grafted on an alumina surface and included the grafting mechanism. It also performs a coupled experimentation-theoretical determination of the structure of the reactive site at the surface.

Palladium carbide formed under the reaction conditions of acetylene hydrogenation.

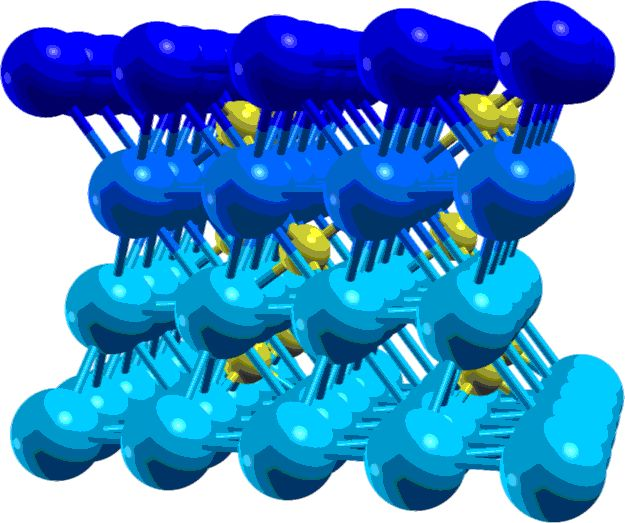
Palladium carbide formed under the reaction conditions of acetylene hydrogenation

It then shows that during the selective hydrogenation of acetylene, the surface of the palladium catalyst is not metallic, but that a surface carbide is formed, responsible for the high selectivity in partial hydrogenation. This demonstration uses in situ spectroscopy combined with simulation.

It then demonstrates the ability to predict the selectivity of a heterogeneous catalytic reaction by a correlation approach on a polyfunctional molecule (unsaturated aldehyde). This work was highlighted by a News and Views in the journal Nature.

It recently shows that, when hydrogenating a double bond on platinum, the coordination of this double bond on the surface is not necessary. It highlights a new six-centre mechanism for heterogeneous catalytic hydrogenation of butadiene, where the double bond approaches above the hydride. The discussion of the various possible situations shows that this new mechanism is favoured over the one with prior coordination.

== Distinctions ==
He was awarded the Raymond Berr Prize from the École Polytechnique in 1985. He was awarded the CNRS bronze medal in 1991 and the CNRS silver medal in 2007. He was awarded the Catalysis Division of the Chemical Society of France in 1993 and the Descartes-Huygens Prize from the Royal Netherlands Academy of Arts and Sciences in 1998. He received the Paul Pascal Prize from the French Academy of sciences in 2008.

He was elected to the French Academy of sciences in 2010.

The Société Chimique de France awarded him the Grand Prix Pierre Süe 2012 for his work in theoretical chemistry and catalysis, as well as for his actions in the service of chemistry in Lyon.

== Scientific publishing ==
Philippe Sautet is or has been editor of many international scientific journals:

- Publisher of the journal "catalysts and catalysed reactions" 2002-2004.
- Member of the international editorial board of "Surface Review and Letters" since 2000
- Member of the international editorial board of the "New Journal of Chemistry" 2002-2005
- Member of the international editorial board of the "Journal of Molecular Catalysis" 2002-2005
- Member of the international editorial board of "Surface Science" since 2006
- Member of the international advisory board of "ChemCatChem" since 2009
- Member of the international advisory board of "Topics in Catalysis" since 2010
- Member of the international advisory board of "Catalysis Letters" since 2010
