= Pierre Braunstein =

French chemist

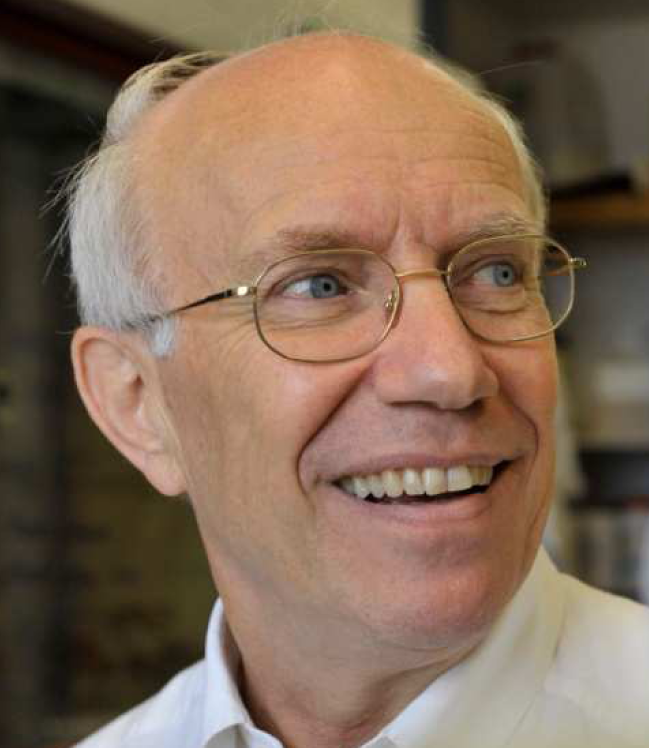
Pierre Braunstein

Pierre Braunstein (born 4 October 1947) is a French chemist. He was director of the Laboratoire de Chimie de Coordination (Coordination Chemistry Laboratory, CNRS-Université de Strasbourg) of Strasbourg (France) and is a member of the French Academy of Sciences.

== Biography ==
He graduated from the École nationale supérieure de chimie de Mulhouse (with rank #1) in 1969 and then obtained his doctorate (Dr.Ing.) (under the supervision of J. Dehand) in inorganic chemistry from the Université Louis Pasteur (ULP) in Strasbourg in 1971. He spent the academic year 1971/72 as a post-doctoral fellow at University College London, with Professors Sir Ronald S. Nyholm and Robin J.H. Clark. After defending his state doctorate thesis at the ULP in 1974, he was awarded an Alexander-von-Humboldt fellowship to spend the academic year (1974/75) at the Technical University of Munich (TUM) with Professor Ernst Otto Fischer (Nobel Prize laureate).

He spent his career at the CNRS, where he became a Research Director. He has been the Director of Research Emeritus since September 2014 and is also a professor "conventionné" at the University of Strasbourg.

== Scientific research ==
His research focuses on the inorganic and organometallic chemistry of the transition metals and the main group elements, where he has (co-)authored of more than 580 scientific publications and review articles. They cover impressively diverse areas ranging from the study of metal-metal-bonded complexes, (hetero)nuclear complexes and atomic aggregates, multisite activation of organic substrates, heterometallic clusters with metallophilic interactions between metal ions with complete electronic shells, functional and hemilable ligands (with donor atoms N, P, O, S, N-heterocyclic carbenes,...) phosphinoenolate complexes, the activation of CO_{2} and organic isocyanates and their catalytic recovery, silylated ligands in a heterobimetallic environment, the study of original quinonoid zwitterions with delocalized organic π systems, which promote electronic communication between metal centres, and allow the modification of the electronic properties of the surfaces on which they are deposited. The applications of his work range from various homogeneous catalysis reactions, including the dehydrogenating coupling of stannanes, H-transfer reactions and ethylene oligomerization, to the first use of bimetallic nanoparticles derived from molecular clusters in heterogeneous catalysis.

He has given more than 480 plenary lectures and invited guests to international conferences and institutions and has received numerous awards and honours from France, Germany, China, Italy, Japan, Portugal, Singapore, Spain, the Netherlands and the United Kingdom. He holds or has held many editorial positions and is regularly called upon to participate in the evaluation of major foreign research programs.

Pierre Braunstein has mentored countless young scientists including ca. 70 PhD students and an equal number of post-doctoral researchers.

He is a member of the French Academy of Sciences and the German Academy of Sciences Leopoldina, a corresponding member of the Zaragoza Academy of Sciences (Spain) and the Lisbon Academy of Sciences (Portugal). He is also a member of the Academia Europaea and the European Academy of Sciences. Since 2015, he is head of the Chemical Sciences Division of the European Academy of Sciences.

== Distinctions ==
=== Prizes ===
- Prize of the Division of Physical and Mineral Chemistry of the French Chemical Society 1975
- Aumale Prize of the French Institute on the proposal of the French Academy of Sciences, 1983
- Alexander-von-Humboldt Forschungspreis, 1988
- Silver medal of the CNRS, 1989
- Max-Planck Forschungspreis (jointly with H. Vahrenkamp, Germany), 1991
- Raymond Beer Grand Prize of the French Chemical Society 1995
- 1st winner of the Paul Sabatier - Miguel Catalán Franco-Spanish Prize between the French Chemical Society and the Royal Spanish Chemical Society, 1998
- Grignard - Georg Wittig Prize between the French Chemical Society and the Gesellschaft Deutscher Chemiker, 1999
- Otto-Warburg Prize (Germany) 2002
- Visiting Professor at the Academia Sinica Taipei, Taipei (Taiwan), 2002
- Grand Prize of the French Institute of Petroleum (IFPEN) of the French Academy of Sciences, 2004
- Descartes-Huygens Prize (Dutch Academy of Sciences), 2008
- International Prize of the Japanese Society of Coordination Chemistry, 2013
- Prize of the International Foundation for Organic Chemistry (Kyoto, Japan), 2013
- Pierre Süe Grand Prize of the French Chemical Sociéty, 2013
- Sacconi Medal (Italian Chemical Society), 2013
- 1st Awardee of the Portugal-France Chemistry Bilateral Lectureship Award between the Sociedade Portuguesa de Química and the French Chemical Society, 2019
- China-France Chemistry Bilateral Lectureship Award between the Chinese Chemical Society and the French Chemical Society, 2020
- European Prize for Organometallic Chemistry of the European Chemical Society (EuChemS), Division of Organometallic Chemistry, 2021

=== Honours ===
- Visiting Professor at the Faculty of Chemistry, University of Konstanz (Germany), 1984
- 1st Great Manchester Inorganic Chemistry Conference - UMIST - Manchester (United Kingdom), 1985
- Weissberger Williams Lecture - Kodak Research Laboratories - Rochester (United States), 1986
- John van Geuns Lecture, Amsterdam (Netherlands), 1993
- Fellow of the Japanese Society for the Promotion of Science - Tokyo, Japan, 1997
- Chini Memorial Lecture (Italian Chemical Society), 2003
- Nyholm Lecture and Medal (Royal Society of Chemistry), 2003
- Molecular Science Forum Lecture Professorship, Chinese Academy of Sciences, Beijing, China, 2006
- Distinguished Visiting Scientist, Institute of Materials and Engineering. A*STAR, Singapore, 2013-2017
- Named "Technische Universität Munich (TUM) Ambassador" (1st promotion), 2013
- Elected Head of the Chemistry Division of the European Academy of Sciences, 2015
- Visiting Professor at Qingdao University of Science and Technology, China, 2016 - 2019
- Qiushi Chair Professor of the University of Zhejiang, China, 2017- 2019
- Professor Chair at Suzhou University (China), 2017-2020
- Appointed Academic "Master" of the "111Project" Rubber-Plastics Materials and Engineering Overseas Expertise Introduction Center for Discipline Innovation, Qingdao University of Science en Technology, China, 2017-2022
- Distinguish Honorary Professor at Yangzhou University (China), 2018-2022.
- Distinguished Visiting Scholar, University of Hong-Kong, 2018
- “Tongji Master Lecture”, Tongji University (China), 2019
- Distinguished professor, Zhejiang University (China), 2019-2024

=== Learned Societies - Academies ===
- Fellow of the Royal Society of Chemistry (CChem FRSC), 1996
- Membre correspondent of the French Academy of Sciences, 1993
- Corresponding member of the Academy of Sciences of Zaragoza (Spain), 2002
- Member of the Academia Europaea, 2002
- Member of the European Academy of Sciences, 2002
- Member of the German National Academy of Sciences Leopoldina, 2005
- Member of the French Academy of Sciences, 2005
- Distinguished member of the French Chemical Society (1st promotion), 2013
- Foreign corresponding member of the Lisbon Academy of Sciences (Portugal), 2015

=== Decorations ===
- Chevalier of the Légion d'honneur. He was made Chevallier by decree of July 13, 2009.
- Officier of the Ordre national du Mérite. He was made "Officier" by decree of May 2, 2017 for 44 years of service.
