= Piet Gros =

Dutch chemist (born 1962)

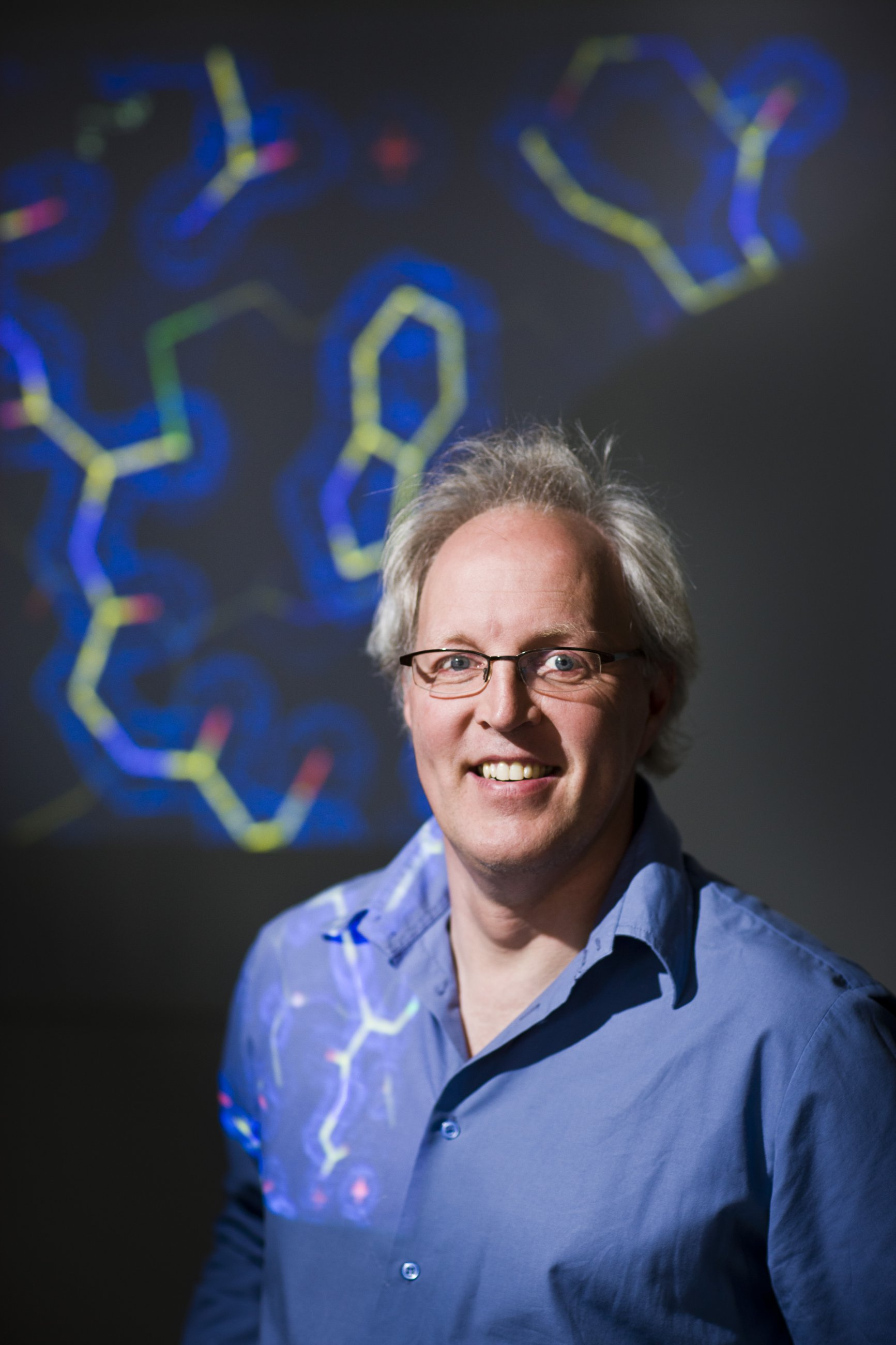
- Piet Gros (2010)
- Born: July 31, 1962 (age 63); Dokkum, The Netherlands
- Occupation: Professor of Biomacromolecular Crystallography
- Employer: Utrecht University
- Known for: Protein crystallography, complement system
- Awards: 2010 Spinoza Prize

Piet Gros (born July 31, 1962 in Dokkum) is a Dutch chemist and professor biomacromolecular crystallography at Utrecht University. In 2010 he received the NWO Spinoza Prize for the elucidation of the three-dimensional structure of the C3 protein, which plays a central role in the complement system and contributes to innate immunity.

== Biography ==
Gros was born in Dokkum, Netherlands. He studied chemistry at the University of Groningen, where he graduated cum laude with a master's degree. Five years later Gros received his PhD degree cum laude at the same university, with a thesis on protein crystallography. Subsequently he became a postdoctoral researcher at the ETH Zurich and later at Yale University. In 1994 Gros was given a position at Utrecht University to conduct experimental research towards new applications for protein crystallography. In 2002 he was given the position of full professor. From 2007 until 2010 Gros was head of the department of chemistry and from 2012 to 2016 he was scientific director of the Bijvoet Centre for Biomolecular Research. Gros received an ERC Advanced grant of the European Research Council in 2008, is a member of the Royal Netherlands Academy of Arts and Sciences (KNAW) since 2010 and in April 2013, Gros became Knight in the Order of the Netherlands Lion, when he received a Royal Decoration for his scientific achievements.

== Research ==
The main expertise of Gros is in the area of protein crystallography methodology and its application to large human plasma proteins and cell-surface receptors and membrane proteins. Among his findings are the molecular mechanisms that underlie key steps in the human immune defense by the complement system, such as the mode of action of complement component 3 and component 8. Other research in his lab has focussed on the adhesion of von Willebrand factor (A1 domain) to its platelet receptor GpIb and the structures of pathogenic bacterial outer-membrane proteins and the movement of individual atoms within the defined protein structures.

== Honours and awards ==
In 2010, Gros received the NWO Spinoza Prize for the elucidation of the three-dimensional structure of the C3 protein. This protein is part of the oldest part of the immune system that is present in the human body, the complement system. Using structural biology techniques such as protein crystallography, the research group of Gros studies structures and chemical interactions that are at the basis of immunological processes such as the complement system. He is the recipient of the 2018 Gregori Aminoff Prize, an international prize awarded since 1979 by the Royal Swedish Academy of Sciences in the field of crystallography. In 2024, he was awarded the ICS Legacy Award of the International Complement Society and the Bijvoet Medal of the Bijvoet Centre for Biomolecular Research.
