= Nico M. M. Nibbering =

Dutch chemist and mass spectrometrist (1938–2014)

Nico M.M. Nibbering
- Born: May 29, 1938; Zaandam, Netherlands
- Died: August 25, 2014 (aged 76)
- Citizenship: Netherlands
- Education: University of Amsterdam
- Known for: Mass spectrometry Ion chemistry
- Awards: Member of the Royal Netherlands Academy of Arts and Sciences (1988); Thomson Medal (1991); Joannes Marcus Marci Award (1992)
- Scientific career
- Thesis: Mass spectrometry of some aralkyl compounds with a functional group in the side-chain (1968)
- Doctoral advisor: Th. J. de Boer

Nicolaas Martinus Maria Nibbering (May 29, 1938 – August 25, 2014) was a Dutch chemist and mass spectrometrist. He was a member of the Royal Netherlands Academy of Arts and Sciences and a recipient of the Thomson Medal and the Joannes Marcus Marci Award.

== Early life and education ==
Nico Nibbering was born May 29, 1938, in the North Holland city of Zaandam. He grew up in the occupied Netherlands and endured the Dutch famine of 1944. He completed high school in Zaandam and went on to the University of Amsterdam in 1956.

Nibbering continued at the University of Amsterdam through his Ph.D. degree in 1968. His thesis was under the direction of Dr. Th. J. de Boer and was entitled “Mass spectrometry of some aralkyl compounds with a functional group in the side-chain.”

== Academic career ==
Under a Shell Travel Fellowship in 1968, Nibbering visited several mass spectrometry labs in the United States including those Fred McLafferty at Cornell University and Frank H. Field at Esso Oil in New Jersey.

He joined the faculty of the University of Amsterdam and was promoted to associate professor in 1975 and professor in 1980. His group built the first Fourier transform ion cyclotron resonance mass spectrometer in Europe.

== Awards ==
In 1988, Nibbering was elected as a member of the Royal Netherlands Academy of Arts and Sciences. He received the International Mass Spectrometry Foundation Thomson Medal in 1991 at the 12th International Congress on Mass Spectrometry in Amsterdam that he chaired. He received the Joannes Marcus Marci Award in 1992.
