= Hamida Demirdache =

French linguist

- Education: MIT
- Occupation: linguist
- Known for: Syntax and semantics of time

Hamida Demirdache is a Canadian linguist specializing in syntax and semantics, known for her work on time and tense.

== Education ==
Demirdache received her PhD at the Massachusetts Institute of Technology in 1991; her thesis, which dealt with resumptives in relative clauses, was advised by Noam Chomsky.

== Career and research ==
She subsequently held a postdoctoral position at the University of California, Irvine, which like her PhD research was funded by the Social Science and Humanities Research Council of Canada. From 1993 to 1998 Demirdache was employed as a lecturer at the University of British Columbia, and in 1998 she moved to the University of Nantes, where she has spent the rest of her career. In 2003 she received her habilitation, and in 2008 she was promoted to full professor. While at Nantes she founded the LLING lab in 2004, and this became a CNRS lab in 2016.

Demirdache conducts research in syntax, semantics and their interfaces as well as language acquisition. She is known for her work on Semitic and Salishan languages. A particular interest of hers is how children acquire abstract linguistic properties and concepts without physical correlates in the external world, such as logical operators, quantifiers, and semantic tense. She also develops experimental methods for the investigation of children's verbal and nonverbal capacities in combining logical primitives into complex conceptual representations, in order to establish the role of language in acquiring these concepts.

== Honours and awards ==
Demirdache has been the recipient of numerous honours and awards. She has held a number of international visiting positions, including at Leiden University (2005–6), the Universitat Autònoma de Barcelona (2011), and the University of Massachusetts at Amherst (2012). In 2003 she was the sole recipient of the Descartes-Huygens Prize. She was elected Member of the Academia Europaea in 2023, and appointed senior member of the Institut Universitaire de France from 2023 to 2028.

== Selected publications ==
- Demirdache, Hamida. 1991. Resumptive chains in restrictive relatives, appositives, and dislocation structures. PhD thesis, MIT.
- Demirdache, Hamida, and Myriam Uribe-Etxebarria. 2000. The primitives of temporal relations. In Roger Martin, David Michaels & Juan Uriagereka (eds.), Step by Step: Essays on Minimalist Syntax in honor of Howard Lasnik, 157-186. Cambridge, MA: MIT Press.
- Demirdache, Hamida, and Myriam Uribe-Etxebarria. 2004. The syntax of time adverbs. In Jacqueline Guéron & Jacqueline Lecarme (eds.), The syntax of time. Cambridge, MA: MIT Press. doi:10.7551/mitpress/6598.003.0008
- Demirdache, Hamida, and Myriam Uribe-Etxebarria. 2007. The syntax of time arguments. Lingua 117 (2), 330–366. doi:10.1016/j.lingua.2005.07.006
- Davis, Henry, and Hamida Demirdache. 2000. On lexical verb meanings: Evidence from Salish. In Carol Tenny & James Pustejovsky (eds.), Events as Grammatical Objects. The Converging Perspectives of Lexical Semantics and Syntax, 97–142. Stanford, CA: CSLI Publications.
