= Hans Vliegenthart =

Dutch chemist

Hans Vliegenhart
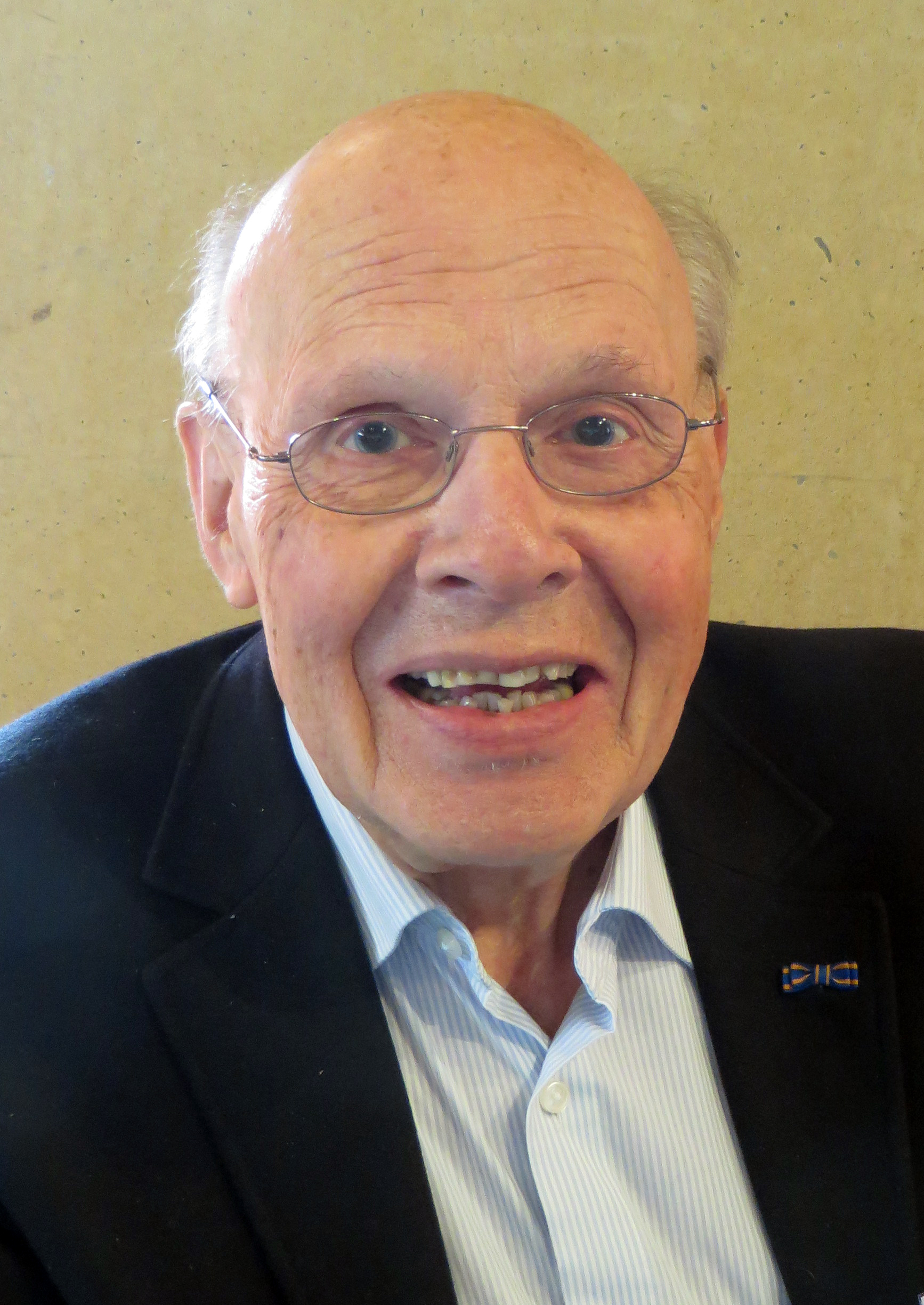
- Hans Vliegenhart (2019)
- Born: 7 April 1936; Zuilen, The Netherlands
- Died: 12 February 2026 (aged 89); Utrecht, The Netherlands
- Education: Utrecht University
- Known for: Bioorganic chemistry
- Scientific career
- Workplaces: Utrecht University
- Doctoral advisor: Prof.dr. J.F. Arens

Johannes Frederik Gerardus (Hans) Vliegenthart (April 7, 1936 – February 12, 2026) was a Dutch emeritus professor in bioorganic chemistry of Utrecht University, well known for his research on the synthesis and characterisation of carbohydrates, and biomolecules containing sugar moieties such as glycoproteins and their role in living cells.

== Biography ==
Hans Vliegenthart was born in Zuilen, the Netherlands in 1936. He studied chemistry at Utrecht University from 1953 to 1960, where he also received his PhD degree in 1967, under supervision of prof. Arens. In 1975, he was appointed lector (a defunct Dutch academic role that changed to professor in 1980) bio-organic chemistry at Utrecht University and was full professor at Utrecht University from 1984 until 2003. From 1999 until 2004, he was also the chairman of the Utrecht University Fund and he still awarded every year the Vliegenthart Thesis Award. In 1988, the founded the Bijvoet Centre for Biomolecular Research at Utrecht University, and he served as the scientific director of the institute until 2000. He served as Dean of the Faculty of Chemistry from 1985 to 1989 and from 2000 to 2003 and in 2003 he became Honorary Professor at Utrecht University. Hans Vliegenthart died on February 12th, 2026.

== Research ==
The research of Vliegenthart focused on the synthesis and characterisation of carbohydrates, glycoproteins, glycolipids and proteoglycans and their role in living cells. He was most famous for his work on the analysis of the primary and three-dimensional structures of carbohydrates and glycoproteins using technologies such as NMR spectroscopy, chromatography and other analytical methods. Vliegenthart applied his knowledge on carbohydrates to various fields of biology and medicine, such as research into blood types, which are largely determined by carbohydrates on red blood cells, synthetic vaccines to protect against Streptococcus pneumoniae and the role of sugar molecules in tumor growth.

== Honours and awards ==
Throughout his career, Vliegenthart has received numerous honours and awards. He has been a member of the Royal Swedish Academy of Sciences since 1987, which allows him to nominate people for the Nobel Prize . In 1989, Vliegenthart became honorary member of the American Society for Biochemistry and Molecular Biology, for his contributions to biochemistry and molecular biology, not only in the Netherlands, but at the highest international level. Vliegenthart has been a member of the Royal Netherlands Academy of Arts and Sciences of the Netherlands since 1990. In 1992, he received an honorary doctorate from the Lajos Kossuth University in Debrecen, Hungary, nowadays known as the University of Debrecen. In 1993 Lille University of Science and Technology in France bestowed him with an honorary doctorate for his contribution to the structural analysis of carbohydrate chains. Vliegenthart was awarded the Claude S. Hudson Award in Carbohydrate Chemistry of the American Chemical Society in 1994. In 1997, the Stockholm University in Sweden awarded him an honorary doctorate. He became Knight of the Order of the Netherlands Lion in 1998. In 2000, he received the Bijvoet Medal of the Bijvoet Centre for Biomolecular Research of Utrecht University. The University of Rome Tor Vergata in Italy awarded him their medal in 2001 and his alma mater, Utrecht University, awarded him their silver medal in 2003. In October 2017, the Council of the American Association for the Advancement of Science (AAAS) elected Vliegenthart as a Fellow of AAAS for his contributions to science and technology in its Section on Biological Sciences.
