= Bert Poolman =

Dutch biochemist

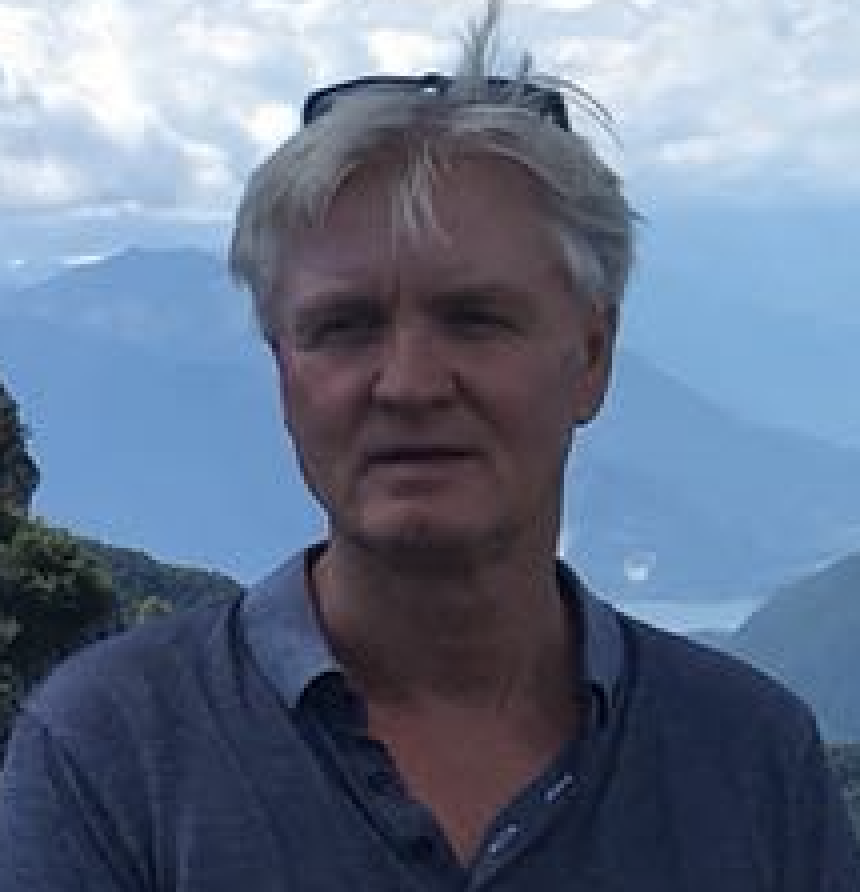
- Bert Poolman
- Born: Bert Poolman; 8 May 1959 (age 67); Avereest, Netherlands
- Education: University of Groningen
- Known for: Membrane biology, bioenergetics, membrane transport
- Spouse: Heleen Stevenson
- Scientific career
- Fields: Biochemistry, biophysics, microbiology, synthetic biology
- Workplaces: University of Groningen, 1989–present
- Thesis: Energy transducing processes in growing and starving lactic acid streptococcci (1987)
- Doctoral advisor: Wil Konings and Hans Veldkamp
- Website: www.rug.nl/staff/b.poolman/

Berend (Bert) Poolman is a Dutch biochemist, as specialist in bioenergetics of microorganisms and membrane transport. He is a professor of Biochemistry at the University of Groningen and an elected member of the Royal Netherlands Academy of Arts and Sciences (KNAW) since 2009. Poolman is a pioneer in the field of bottom-up synthetic biology, that is, the construction from molecular building blocks of functional metabolic networks and autonomously operating functional systems, which are typical of living cells. Poolman is a lecturer in membrane biology and synthetic biology.

== Education and career ==
Poolman pursued studies in Biochemistry and Microbiology at the University of Groningen, the Netherlands, and the University of Bern (Switzerland), obtaining a MSc degree in 1984. He gained his PhD in 1987 with a thesis on bioenergetics of streptococci, under the supervision of Wil Konings and Hans Veldkamp. After a brief stint as a scientist at Genencor Inc (now Dupont Industrial Biosciences) in San Francisco (USA), he returned to the Netherlands in the end of 1989 to start his own research group on biochemistry and molecular biology of membrane transport at the University of Groningen, supported by a fellowship from the Royal Netherlands Academy of Arts and Sciences. He has been professor of biochemistry at the Groningen since 1998. In 2008 he was appointed Program Director of its Centre for Synthetic Biolog), and in 2013 he became Scientific Director of its Biomolecular Sciences and Biotechnology Institute. In 1993 Poolman has done a sabbatical at Transgene SA, Strasbourg (France). Thanks to a Fulbright fellowship, he was visiting professor in biochemistry at California Institute of Technology, Pasadena (USA) in 2003.

Poolman has been Chair of the KNAW Earth and Life Sciences Board, and has been vice-chair of KNAW Council for Natural and Technical Sciences since 2017. From 2016 to 2018, he was a member of the Dutch Council for Physics and Chemistry, and currently he is a member of the core team of the Council for Chemistry. Since 2009 he led the focus area on ‘Biomolecular and Bioinspired Functionality’ at the Zernike Institute for Advanced Materials (University of Groningen, together with Nobel laureate Ben Feringa, and, from 2010 to 2017, he managed a national Synthetic Biology program of the University of Groningen.

== Research ==
Poolman has made seminal contributions to the understanding of the dynamics and permeability of biological membranes and to the field of vectorial biochemistry, that is, the role of electrochemical gradients in the fuelling and regulation of membrane transport. He demonstrated that the exchange of different sugars can be more advantageous for a cell than sugar-proton symport, and showed that cells exploit the coupling of substrate import to product exchange to conserve metabolic energy.

He is an expert in the field of ATP-binding cassette transporters, one of the largest known protein families, by combining functional and structural studies. Highlights include: discovery of export of hydrophobic compounds from the inner leaflet of the lipid bilayer; elucidation of sensing and gating mechanism of ABC importers involved in cell volume regulation; single-molecule fluorescence studies to elucidate the mechanism of solute capture and translocation; structural basis for peptide selection by receptors involved in nitrogen uptake; structural basis for vitamin recognition and transport by a new class of ABC importers; and the energy coupling stoichiometry of ABC importers. Poolman has advanced of membrane transport by combining mechanistic in vitro studies with in vivo analyses of transporter regulation. His group has developed innovative technologies in membrane reconstitution and the probing of the physicochemical state of both the cytoplasm and the cell membrane. His group was the first to show that changes in the ionic strength are used to gate the activity of osmoregulatory transporters, providing the cell with a simple on/off switch to control its cytoplasmic volume. In parallel, his group developed sensors to quantify changes in ionic strength and excluded volume (macromolecular crowding).

== Current research (2020) ==
His main current research areas include: (i) bacterial cell-volume regulation: elucidation of the homeostatic mechanisms that control the physicochemistry of the cell; (ii) building of synthetic cells: construction of functional out-of-equilibrium systems for metabolic energy conservation and development of cell volume regulatory networks. What tasks should a living cell minimally perform and how this can be accomplished with a minimal set of components? and (iii) the molecular mechanisms of membrane transport proteins: understanding the dynamics, energetics and mechanisms of solute transporters in the plasma membrane.

== Publications ==
- Poolman is ISI highly cited researcher in microbiology. He has published over 275 peer-reviewed papers in international scientific journals, which have been cited more than 25,000 times. His H-index (Google Scholar) is 83, and he holds four patents. Poolman shares his findings with wide audiences through newspaper, radio and TV appearances. In 2012 Schrauwers and Poolman wrote the book Synthetische Biologie: de Mens als Schepper (Synthetic Biology: Man as a Creator) to convey the developments in synthetic biology to a lay audience.

== Awards and fellowships ==
Poolman has received numerous awards, including the Biochemistry Award (1989) of the Dutch Biochemistry and Molecular Biology Organisation (NVBMB), a Royal Netherlands Academy of Arts and Sciences fellowship (1989), a Human Frontiers Science Program Organization award (1992), the SON ‘Jonge Chemici’ award (1997), the Federation European Biochemical Society Lecturer Award (2014), and the Joel Mandelstam Memorial Lecture award (2016).

He obtained four TOP program grants from the Netherlands Organisation for Scientific Research (NWO)(2001, 2007, 2010, 2014)., two program grants from the Netherlands Proteomics Centre (2005 en 2008), and coordinated three large European networks (1996, 1999 and 2012). In 2015 he received an ERC Advanced Grant and in 2019 an ERC Proof-of-Concept Grant, and in 2017 the BaSyC consortium (with Poolman as one of the lead principal investigators) was awarded a multimillion Dutch Gravitation grant.

== Personal life ==
Poolman was born in 1959 as the first son of Jelto Poolman and Neeltje Prinsse. In 1983 he married Heleen Stevenson (1959), with whom he has four children.

== Links ==
- Towards a metabolism for synthetic cells (video KNAW-symposium: Op jacht naar de minimale cel, 24 juni 2015 op Vimeo)
- De mens als schepper (The human being as creator. Unifocus on YouTube. Subtitles in English)
