= Netherlands Bioinformatics Centre =

Dutch bioinformatics organization

- Type: Not-for-profit organisation
- Location: Netherlands
- Website: www.nbic.nl

The Netherlands Bioinformatics Centre or NBIC (2003–2013) was a Dutch, government-funded organization, that coordinated all academic work on bioinformatics in the Netherlands. NBIC consisted of programs for research (BioRange), for education (BioWise), and for support (BioAssist). NBIC partners are all Dutch universities and university hospitals, and some commercial entities. The NBIC central office was hosted by the Center for Molecular and Biomolecular Informatics (CMBI) at the Radboud University Nijmegen Medical Centre.

== History ==
In 2003 NBIC was launched as a not-for-profit organization, to strengthen and organize the bioinformatics research in the Netherlands. NBIC is one of the four enabling technology centres that were initiated by the Netherlands Genomics Initiative (NGI) to improve the genomics-based research in the Netherlands. The other three technology centres are: the Netherlands Proteomics Centre (NPC), the Netherlands Metabolomics Centre (NMC) and the Netherlands Consortium for Systems Biology (NCSB). Most services moved to the Dutch Techcentre for Life Sciences in 2015.

== Funding ==
The Netherlands Bioinformatics Centre was funded by the Dutch government through the Netherlands Genomics Initiative (NGI) and the BSIK(knowledge infrastructures) programme.

== Support ==
The support department of NBIC, BioAssist, consists of task forces that bring together experts in the different fields of Bioinformatics. Together, these people identify common problems in their field that they set out to solve in a collaborative way. BioAssist also has a group, BioInformatics Research Support (BRS), that helps biological and medical professionals with short bioinformatics projects.

== Education ==
The education part of NBIC, BioWise, organizes courses and trainings at different levels. They provide awareness training at schools, collaborate with the different bioinformatics education programs at the universities in the Netherlands, and organize trainings for PhD students. Also, subject-specific trainings and conferences are organized, either nationally or with other international partners like the Swiss Institute of Bioinformatics.

== Achievements ==
=== Organising bioinformatics research ===
NBIC partnered with Dutch universities of Applied Sciences (UAS) in the LOBIN network. in July 2011, four UASes had joined.

=== Bioinformatics software ===
A wide variety of bioinformatics software has been created by people involved in NBIC. NBIC also hosted a service to coordinate software development (Trac server with software releases and project documentation). Many tools are also made available through NBIC's own open Galaxy server.

=== Industrial links ===
First steps have been made to include commercial entities, among others, via the Bioinformatics Industrial Users Platform (BIUP). The BIUP, though still in its start-up phase in mid-2011, has already attracted partners such as DSM.

=== Community building ===
A large part of NBIC's efforts focus on developing new or strengthening existing bio-informatics communities. For example, NBIC hosted the 2011 Galaxy Community Conference.

The Netherlands Bioinformatics for Proteomics Platform (NBPP) is a joint initiative of the Netherlands Bioinformatics Centre (NBIC) and the Netherlands Proteomics Centre (NPC). It provides data processing services to analyse proteomics liquid chromatography-mass spectrometry (LC-MS) data based on open source tools or tools developed by members of and available within the platform. This builds an infrastructure that allows non-experts i.e. wet lab scientists to run a typical proteomics analysis pipelines and workflows, and for experts to experiment with different variations of the analysis.

The inaugural meeting of the Global Organisation for Bioinformatics Learning, Education and Training (GOBLET) was held at NBIC in November 2012.
