= Louis Sicking =

Dutch Historian

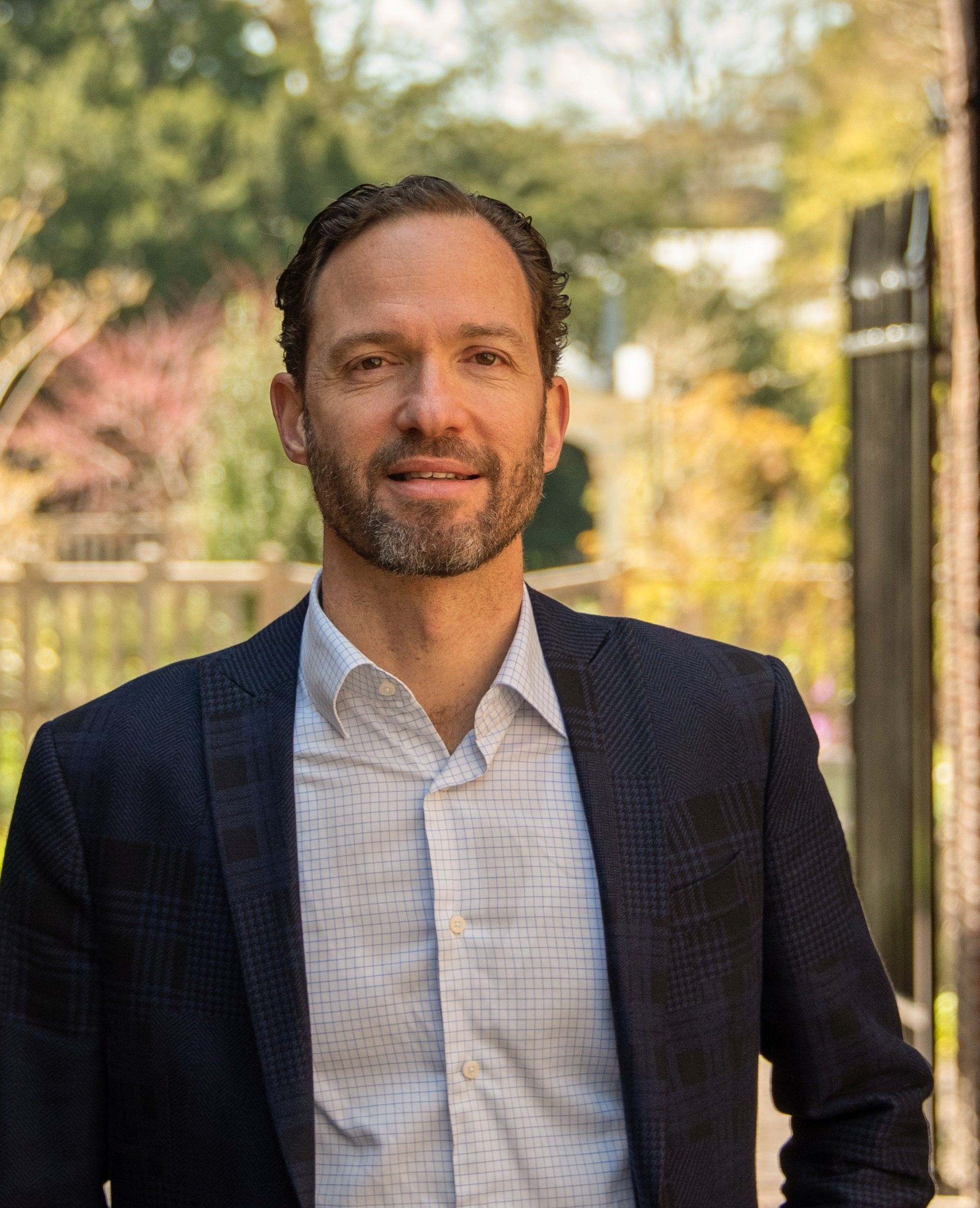
- Born: March 11, 1966 (age 60)
- Awards: Descartes-Huygens Prize (2016)

Academic background
- Thesis: Zeemacht en onmacht: Maritieme politiek in de Nederlanden, 1488-1558 (1996)
- Doctoral advisor: Wim Blockmans and J.R. Bruijn

Academic work
- Discipline: Historian
- Sub-discipline: Medieval and Early Modern History
- Institutions: Vrije Universiteit Amsterdam Universiteit Leiden

Louis H. J. Sicking (born March 11, 1966) is a Dutch historian. Sicking is Aemilius Papinianus professor of History of Public International Law at Vrije Universiteit Amsterdam. In 2016 he was awarded the Descartes-Huygens Prize.

== Education ==
Sicking holds a Master's degree in overseas history from the University of Aix-en-Provence and a doctorate in history from Leiden University.

== Works ==
His research mainly concerns maritime history, and the history of diplomacy and international law in the late Middle Ages and the Early modern period. Recurring elements in Sicking's work are the French and Dutch language areas, as well as the lasting influence of the Middle Ages that extends into subsequent periods.

His thesis was published in English as Neptune and the Netherlands: State, Economy, and War at Sea in the Renaissance (2004). In this work, Sicking departs from a strictly Belgian or Dutch perspective, focusing instead on the origins of the Burgundian-Habsburg maritime organization in the broader context of the Netherlands.

Serving as a lecturer of Medieval and Early Modern History at Leiden University since 2001, Sicking also holds an endowed chair in the history of international law at Vrije Universiteit Amsterdam since 2013. In recognition of his scholarly achievements, Sicking was honored with the Descartes-Huygens Prize in 2016.

== Selected publications ==
=== Books ===
- Sicking, L. (2004). Neptune and the Netherlands: state, economy, and war at sea in the Renaissance. Leiden: Brill. ISBN 978-90-04-13850-6
- Sicking, L. (2008). Colonial Borderlands. France and the Netherlands in the Atlantic in the Nineteenth Century. Leiden: Martinus Nijhoff. ISBN 978-90-04-16960-9
- Sicking, L. (2015). La naissance d'une thalassocratie. Les Pays-Bas et la mer à l’aube du Siècle d’or. Paris: PUPS. ISBN 978-2-84050-998-1
- Sicking, L. (2021). De bijl van Sint-Olav. Op zoek naar Noorse schatten in de Nederlanden. Zutphen: Walburgpers. ISBN 978-94-6249-654-5

=== Collective volumes ===
- Sicking, L. and Abreu-Ferreira, D. (eds.). (2009). Beyond the Catch. Fisheries of the North Atlantic, the North Sea and the Baltic, 900-1850. Leiden/Boston: Brill. ISBN 978-90-04-16973-9
- Sicking, L. and Wijffels, A. (eds.). (2020). Conflict Management in the Mediterranean and the Atlantic, 1200-1800. Actors, Institutions and Strategies of Dispute Settlement. Leiden/Boston: Brill. ISBN 978-90-04-38063-9
- Ebben, M.A. and Sicking, L. (eds.). (2021). Beyond Ambassadors: Consuls, Missionaries and Spies in Pre-Modern Diplomacy (Research group Institute for History: Europe 1000-1800). Leiden/Boston: Brill. ISBN 978-90-04-43884-2

=== Main articles ===
- Sicking, L. (2013). Selling and buying protection: Dutch war fleets at the service of Venice, 1617-1667. Studia Venetia, LXVII, 89-106.
- Sicking, L. (2015). European Naval Warfare. In H. Scott (ed.), Oxford Handbook of early modern European History 1350-1750. Volume II: Cultures and Power. Oxford: OUP. ISBN 978-0-19-959726-0
- Sicking, L. (2018). The Pirate and the Admiral. Europeanisation and Globalisation of Maritime Conflict Regulation. Journal of the History of International Law, 20(4), 429-470.
- Sicking, L. and van Rhee, R. (2019). The English Search for a Northeast Passage to Asia Reconsidered: How ‘Flemish’ fishermen put the Edward Bonaventure in jeopardy on its return journey in 1554. The Mariners Mirror, 105(4), 388-406.
- Sicking, L. (2020). The Medieval Origin of the Factory or the Institutional Foundations of Overseas Trade. Toward a Model for Global Comparison. Journal of World History, 31(2), 295-326.
