= Caroline van Eck =

Dutch art historian and academic

Caroline Alexandra van Eck FBA (born 22 July 1959) is a Dutch art historian and academic, specialising in the art and architecture of the early modern period. Since 2016, she has been Professor of Art History at the University of Cambridge and a Fellow of King's College, Cambridge. She was Professor of Art and Architecture at Leiden University from 2006 to 2016, and previously taught at Vrije Universiteit Amsterdam and the University of Groningen. She was the 2017 Slade Professor of Fine Art at the University of Oxford.

== Honours ==
In March 2014, van Eck was awarded the 2013 Descartes-Huygens Prize by the French Académie des Sciences Morales et Politiques.

In December 2014, van Eck was appointed a Chevalier (Knight) of the Ordre National du Mérite by the President of France. She was awarded the Grand Prix du Rayonnement de la Littérature et Culture Françaises by the Académie française in 2015.

In 2020 van Eck was elected a fellow of the Academia Europaea and of the British Academy.

== Selected works ==
- van Eck, Caroline (1993). Organicism in nineteenth-century architecture: an inquiry into its theoretical and philosophical background. Amsterdam: Architectura & Natura Press. ISBN 978-9071570292.
- van Eck, Caroline (2007). Classical rhetoric and the visual arts in early modern Europe. Cambridge: Cambridge University Press. ISBN 978-0521844352.
