= Isabelle Olivieri =

French biologist (1957–2016)

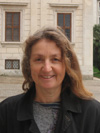
- Born: 9 March 1957; Montoire-sur-le-Loir
- Died: 10 December 2016 (aged 59); Montpellier
- Scientific career
- Fields: Genetics
- Institutions: University of Montpellier

Isabelle Olivieri (9 March 1957 – 10 December 2016) was a French agricultural engineer and biologist, specialising in the evolutionary sciences, particularly genetics and population biology. She developed mathematical modelling for demographic and evolutionary processes, evolutionary interpretations based on molecular phylogenetics, the evolutionary biology of invasions, biodiversity conservation, life cycles, and speciation. She is one of 72 women whose names have been proposed to be added to the Eiffel Tower.

== Early life and education ==
Isabelle Olivieri was born on 9 March in Montoire-sur-le-Loir. In 1979, she undertook a DAA master's internship at the Institut national de la recherche agronomique (INRA) in Antibes. In 1980, she wrote her thesis on Mediterranean thistles, (an invasive species in Australia) at the CSIRO Centre in Montpellier, one of the Australian Commonwealth Scientific and Industrial Research Organisation's bases in France. In 1982 she qualified as a Doctor of Engineering from INAPG and as a Doctor of Science from Montpellier-2 University in 1987.

== Career ==
1980, Olivieri began work as an agricultural engineer at the Paris-Grignon National Agronomic Institute, AgroParisTech. In 1983 she undertook postdoctoral work at Paul Ehrlich's laboratory at Stanford University in California. In 1984 she returned to France and worked as a researcher in genetics and plant breeding at the Institut national de la recherche agronomique (INRA) in Montpellier.

In 1993, Olivieri was appointed as the first professor of population genetics at the University of Montpellier. She taught on formal genetics and population genetics, theoretical biology, population biology applied to conservation and biodiversity management. Her research focused on genetics and evolutionary ecology of metapopulations, plant-insect interactions, biological control, conservation biology and biodiversity, evolution and consequences of dispersal, local selection, and speciation. She developed a mathematical modelling approach to demographic and evolutionary processes, evolutionary interpretations based on molecular phylogenetics, evolutionary biology of invasions, biodiversity conservation, life cycles, and speciation.

In 2004 Olivieir was elected vice-president of the European Society for Evolutionary Biology, and became President of ESEB in 2007. She was elected vice-president of the American Society for the Study of Evolution the same year.

Isabelle Olivieri died of cancer on 10 December 2016 in Montpellier.

== Contributions ==
Her former colleague at the University of Montpellier, Agnès Mignot, remembers Olivieri as among the first to propose "mathematical models of the demographic and evolutionary processes of plants" as a result of her focus on their population dynamics.

Her early work on the interaction between plants and insects, including her thesis on Mediterranean thistles, continued over many years, leading to "Genetic, ecological, behavioral and geographic differentiation of populations in a thistle weevil: implications for speciation and biocontrol", which was published in January 2008.

Deeply concerned with the issue of conservation, Oliviera undertook extensive work on the risk of extinction of Centaurea corymbosa or Clape centary, a species native to the Narbonne area in southern France. Her landmark study on its conservation was published in 2008 as "Restoration demography: a 10-year demographic comparison between introduced and natural populations of endemic Centaurea corymbosa (Asteraceae)".

== Recognition ==
- 2004 – Descartes–Huygens Prize
- 2007 – CNRS Silver Medal
- 2009 – appointed to the Institut universitaire de France
- 2012 – Grand Prix de la Société française d’écologie

In 2009, she was offered the Legion of Honour but refused it as she disagreed with the science policies of the government at the time.

In 2026, Isabelle Olivieri was announced as one of 72 historical women in STEM whose names have been proposed to be added to the 72 men already celebrated on the Eiffel Tower. The plan was announced by the Mayor of Paris, Anne Hidalgo following the recommendations of a committee led by Isabelle Vauglin of Femmes et Sciences and Jean-François Martins, representing the operating company which runs the Eiffel Tower.
