= Harry Struijker Boudier =

Cardiovascular pharmacologist

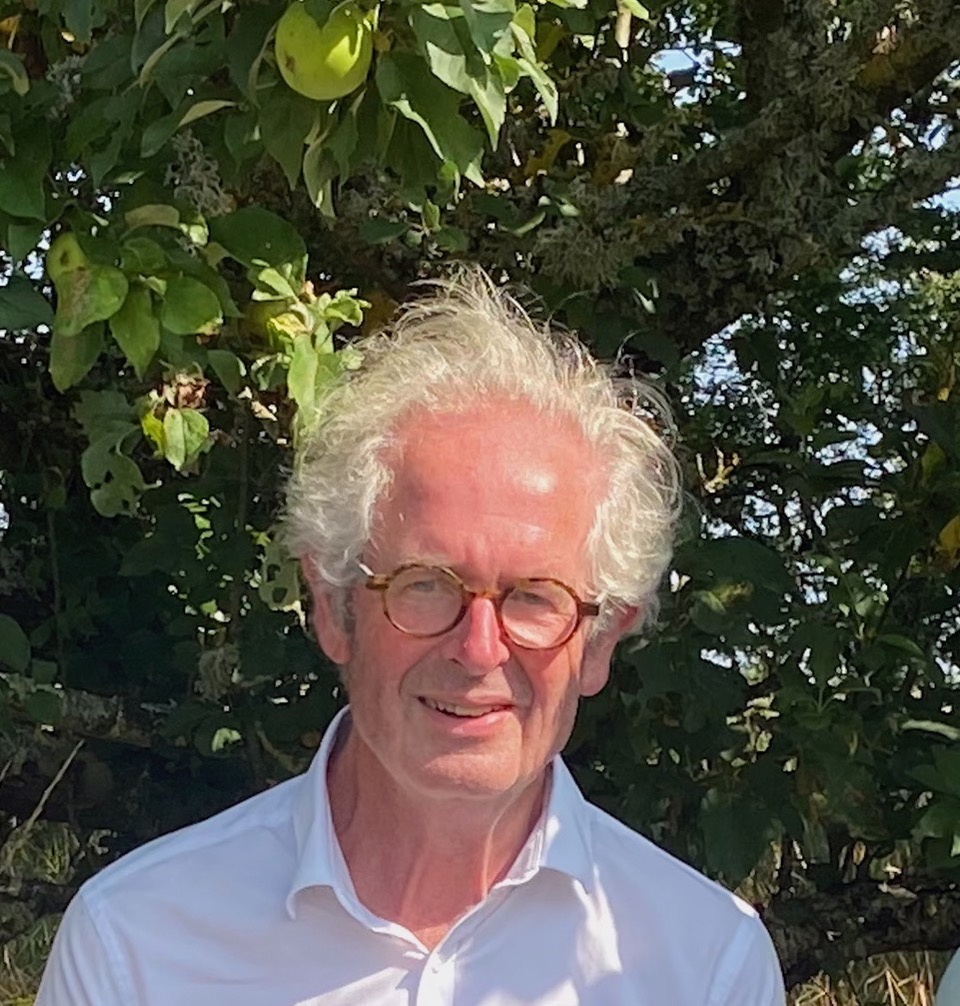
- Occupations: Cardiovascular pharmacologist and academic

Academic background
- Education: Graduation; Doctor of Philosophy
- Alma mater: Radboud University Nijmegen

Harry Struijker Boudier is a cardiovascular pharmacologist and academic. He is an emeritus professor of Pharmacology at Maastricht University.

Struijker Boudier's research has been focused in the areas of cardiovascular disease, pharmacological science, and pharmacotherapy. He has received the Saavan Zwanenberg Honorary Prize, an honorary doctorate from the University of Liège, Belgium, and Prix Descartes-Huygens from the French Académie des Sciences. He was also appointed an Officer of the Order of Orange-Nassau of the Dutch Royal House in 2010.

== Education ==
Struijker Boudier completed his graduation in Pharmacochemistry and Biochemistry and Doctor of Philosophy in Pharmacology from the Radboud University Nijmegen in 1973 and 1975, respectively.

== Career ==
At the University of Maastricht Medical School, Struijker Boudier held the role of professor of Experimental Pharmacology and chaired the Department of Pharmacology and Toxicology. He was also designated as a scientific director of the Cardiovascular Research Institute Maastricht. He is the chairman of the scientific board of the Paris Cardiovascular Research Center and the Nancy Cardiovascular Research Center. He also holds the title of emeritus professor at Maastricht University.

== Research ==
During his early research studies, Struijker Boudier highlighted the vascular origin of hypertension, in particular at the level of the microcirculation. In a later follow-up, together with Le Noble and Levy, he showed that VEGF (Vascular Endothelial Growth Factor) inhibitors cause hypertension. His research also highlighted that dysfunctional microcirculation is a key shared mechanism that induces diabetes and hypertension.

Together with Kool and Van Bortel, Struijker Boudier documented that smoking, even one cigarette, increases arterial stiffness and augments the risk of cardiovascular diseases and stroke. In another collaborative study, he emphasized that arterial aging is not uniform; muscular arteries change less with age, whereas central arteries stiffen significantly. Furthermore, he examined the clinical implications of arterial stiffness, specifically its role in predicting cardiovascular diseases. In addition, he discussed appropriate assessment methods for arterial stiffness, emphasizing the shift to more direct measures, such as carotid-femoral pulse wave velocity (PWV) and augmentation index.

== Awards and honors ==
- 2001 – Doctor Honoris Causa, University of Liège, Belgium
- 2002 – Descartes-Huygens Prize, French Académie des Sciences
- 2010 – Officer, Order of Orange-Nassau of the Royal Dutch House
- 2019 – Saavan Zwanenberg Honorary Prize, Royal Holland Society of Sciences and Humanities

== Selected articles ==
- Levy, B. I.; Ambrosio, G.; Pries, A. R.; Struijker Boudier, H. A. J. (2001). "Microcirculation in hypertension: a new target for treatment?". Circulation. 104 (6): 735–740. doi:10.1161/hc3101.091158. PMID 11489784.
- Safar, M. E.; Levy, B. I.; Struijker Boudier, H. (2003). "Current perspectives on arterial stiffness and pulse pressure in hypertension and cardiovascular diseases". Circulation. 107 (22): 2864–2869. doi:10.1161/01.CIR.0000069826.36125.B4. PMID 12796414.
- Laurent, S.; Cockcroft, J.; Van Bortel, L.; Boutouyrie, P.; Giannattasio, C.; Hayoz, D.; Struijker Boudier, H. (2006). "Expert consensus document on arterial stiffness: methodological issues and clinical applications". European Heart Journal. 27 (21): 2588–2605. doi:10.1093/eurheartj/ehl254. PMID 17000623.
- Levy, B. I.; Schiffrin, E. L.; Mourad, J. J.; Agostini, D.; Vicaut, E.; Safar, M. E.; Struijker Boudier, H. A. (2008). "Impaired tissue perfusion: a pathology common to hypertension, obesity, and diabetes mellitus". Circulation. 118 (9): 968–976. doi:10.1161/CIRCULATIONAHA.107.763730. PMID 18725503.
- Mancia, Giuseppe; Laurent, Stéphane; Agabiti-Rosei, Enrico; Ambrosioni, Ettore; Burnier, Michel; Caulfield, Mark J.; Cifkova, Renata; Clément, Denis; Coca, Antonio; Dominiczak, Anna; Erdine, Serap; Fagard, Robert; Farsang, Csaba; Grassi, Guido; Haller, Hermann; Heagerty, Antony; Kjeldsen, Sverre E.; Kiowski, Wolfgang; Mallion, Jean Michel; Manolis, Athanasios; Narkiewicz, Krzysztof; Nilsson, Peter; Olsen, Michael H.; Rahn, Karl Heinz; Redon, Josep; Rodicio, José; Ruilope, Luis; Schmieder, Roland E.; Struijker Boudier, Harry A.J.; Van Zwieten, Pieter A.; Viigimaa, Margus; Zanchetti, Alberto (2009). "Reappraisal of European guidelines on hypertension management: a European Society of Hypertension Task Force document". Blood Pressure. 18 (6): 308–347. doi:10.3109/08037050903450468. PMID 20001654.
