= Marc Baldus =

German physicist and academic

- Occupation: Professor of NMR spectroscopy
- Employer: Utrecht University
- Known for: Solid-state nuclear magnetic resonance, Structural biology

Marc Baldus is a physicist and professor of NMR spectroscopy at Utrecht University. He is especially known for his work in the field of structural biology using solid-state nuclear magnetic resonance (ssNMR) spectroscopy. He applies ssNMR methods to establish structure-function relationships in complex biomolecular systems including membrane and Amyloid proteins. In addition, he develops cellular NMR methods to study large molecular transport and insertion systems in bacteria as well as signal transduction mechanisms in eukaryotic cells.

== Biography ==
Marc Baldus studied physics at the Technische Universität Darmstadt, after which he became a Diploma Student at the Department of Physics of University of Florida in Gainesville, USA. He obtained his PhD degree in 1996 from the ETH Zurich in Switzerland. After postdoctoral research at MIT and Leiden University he became group leader at the Max Planck Institute for Biophysical Chemistry in Goettingen, Germany. In 2008 he became Full Professor of Structural Biology in the Bijvoet Centre for Biomolecular Research at Utrecht University in Utrecht. From 2016 to 2019 he was scientific director of the Bijvoet Centre for Biomolecular Research.

== Research ==
Marc Baldus is an expert in the field of structural biology using solid-state nuclear magnetic resonance (ssNMR) spectroscopy. In addition, he develops cellular NMR methods for structural biology, such as Dynamic Nuclear Polarization (DNP) NMR spectroscopy and his research group at Utrecht University was the first group worldwide with a 527 GHz Solid State DNP-NMR spectrometer. Baldus is also the coordinator of the uNMR-NL project, funded by the Netherlands Organisation for Scientific Research (NWO) with 18.5M Euro, to establish a national infrastructure for ultra-high field NMR spectroscopy, a joined initiative between Utrecht University, the Radboud University Nijmegen, Wageningen University, Leiden University, Eindhoven University of Technology and the Dutch public-private partnership COAST for the analytical sciences. The uNMR-NL facility was officially opened by Dutch Undersecretary for Education, Culture and Science, Sander Dekker on November 5, 2015.

The main focus of the research of Marc Baldus is the use of solid state NMR spectroscopy to study the structure and dynamics of proteins and other biomolecules. He has used the technology amongst others to study the behavior of bacterial proteins, protein aggregation in Alzheimer's and Parkinson's disease, to study the effect of sugars on membrane behaviour, for the analysis of membrane embedded proteins such as G-protein coupled receptors and ion channels and for the characterization of novel drug delivery systems. In recent years, his attention has been focussed on the analysis of in-cell NMR to study the structure and function of proteins in their native cellular environment.

== Honours and awards ==
Marc Baldus received the Founders Medal of the International Conference on Magnetic Resonance in Biological Systems (ICMRBS) in August 2006. In 2014, Marc Baldus received the Günther Laukien Prize from Richard Ernst, 1991 Nobel laureate in Chemistry. The prize recognizes cutting-edge experimental NMR research, is awarded yearly and is one of the most prestigious prizes in the field of NMR and MRI.
