= Jook Walraven =

Dutch experimental physicist

Jook Walraven (right) in his lab at the Van der Waals-Zeeman Institute

Joannes Theodorus Maria (Jook) Walraven (born August 20, 1947, Amsterdam) is a Dutch experimental physicist at the Van der Waals-Zeeman Institute for experimental physics at the University of Amsterdam. From 1967 he studied physics at the University of Amsterdam. Both his doctoral research and PhD research was with Isaac Silvera, on the subject of Bose-Einstein Condensation. Because of the difficulty of his research subject, his promotion took six years instead of four. The aim of his PhD research was to make a gas of atomic hydrogen, which could become the world's first quantum gas. This might then be a suitable candidate for a Bose-Einstein Condensate (BEC).

In order to achieve this state, the gas of atomic hydrogen would have to be cooled to only a few Kelvin, without recombining to molecular hydrogen. Jook Walraven developed a method of evaporative cooling: a tank was filled with a gas of atomic hydrogen, from which the 'hottest' (fastest) atoms were removed. This resulted in a lower temperature of the whole gas. To keep the atomic hydrogen from forming hydrogen molecules, the atoms were spin-polarized by a 7 tesla magnet.

In a few years, Silvera and Walraven had achieved the first quantum-gas. However, due to interactions with the wall of the tank, the gas did not cool enough to reach the critical temperature at which it condenses into a BEC. In the meantime, several other groups had started to do research on the subject, some of which were actually doing research in laser science. Two of these groups managed to achieve the first BEC in 1995 by using evaporative cooling in combination with laser cooling.

In 1996 Jook Walraven was offered the position of director at AMOLF, which he accepted. He decided to change fields to laser science, and achieved his first BEC a few years later.

In November 2005, Jook Walraven was elected a fellow of the American Physical Society (APS), "for pioneering experimental and theoretical contributions to the physics of quantum gases".
