= Joe L. Franklin =

- Born: 1906; Natchez, Mississippi
- Died: 1982 (aged 75–76)
- Scientific career
- Fields: Mass spectrometry
- Institutions: Humble Oil; Rice University

Joseph Louis Franklin (1906 – August 25, 1982) was a Robert A. Welch Professor of Chemistry at Rice University known for his research in mass spectrometry and ion molecule chemistry. The Frank H. Field and Joe L. Franklin Award for Outstanding Achievement in Mass Spectrometry is named after him and Frank H. Field.

== Early life and education ==
Joseph Franklin was born in Natchez, Mississippi in 1906 but his family moved to Texas early in his life. He went to the University of Texas to study chemistry and received a B.S. degree in 1929, M.S. in 1930, and Ph.D. in 1934.

== Humble Oil ==
Franklin took a position at Humble Oil in Baytown, Texas in 1934 where he established a mass spectrometry research group. He recruited Frank Field to Humble Oil in 1952 and they co-wrote Electron Impact Phenomena and the Properties of Gaseous Ions in 1957. Franklin took a two-year leave 1957–1958 at the National Bureau of Standards in Washington, D.C. before returning to Humble.

== Rice University ==
In 1963, Franklin took a position as Robert A. Welch Professor of chemistry at Rice University. He became an emeritus professor in 1976. He helped to found the American Society for Mass Spectrometry and became the first president of that organization in 1969.

== Field and Franklin Award ==
In 1983, the Frank H. Field and Joe L. Franklin Award for Outstanding Achievement in Mass Spectrometry was established in his honor by the American Chemical Society.
