= Willem Vos =

Willem Lambertus Vos (born August 30, 1964, Amstelveen) is a Dutch scientist. He is Professor of Physics at the University of Twente and former group leader at the Institute for Atomic and Molecular Physics "AMOLF" In 2004, with his group members, Peter Lodahl et al. they succeeded in controlling the pace of light emission, varying from a light drizzle to a rainstorm. In the process, the team has verified a 1987 prediction of American physicist Eli Yablonovitch that ignited a worldwide rush to build tiny "chips" that control light beams. The achievement of Dr. Lodahl and a team of physicists and chemists was reported on in Nature (430). Researchers say it has many potential uses, not only as a tool for controlling quantum optical systems, but also in efficient miniature lasers for display devices and telecommunications, in solar cells, and even in future quantum computers.
