= Surface Review and Letters =

- Discipline: Materials science, Engineering
- Language: English
- Edited by: S.Y. Tong

Publication details
- History: 1994-present
- Publisher: World Scientific (Singapore)

Standard abbreviations
- ISO 4: Surf. Rev. Lett.

Indexing
- ISSN: 0218-625X (print); 1793-6667 (web)

Links
- Journal homepage

Surface Review and Letters is an international journal published by World Scientific. It was launched in 1994, and covers both theoretical and experimental research in physical and properties and processes that occur at the boundaries of materials. Topics covered include surface and interface structures; electronic, magnetic and optical properties; chemical reactions at surfaces; defects, nucleation and growth; and new surface and interface characterization techniques.

== Abstracting and indexing ==
The journal is abstracted and indexed in:

- Science Citation Index
- ISI Alerting Services
- Materials Science Citation Index
- Current Contents/Physical, Chemical & Earth Sciences
- Astrophysics Data System (ADS) Abstract Service
- Inspec
- Compendex
