= Netherlands Proteomics Centre =

Proteomics research center

The Netherlands Proteomics Centre (NPC) is a Dutch research center in the field of proteomics. The research is focused on the proteome, the entire set of proteins expressed by a genome, cell, tissue or organism.

The NPC was established by Prof. Dr. Albert Heck in 2003 and is located in the city of Utrecht. NPC is part of the Netherlands Genomics Initiative (NGI).

== Cooperating institutions ==
Within NPC there is cooperation between seven universities, four academic medical centers and a number of biotechnology companies:

- Utrecht University (UU)
- University Medical Center Utrecht (UMCU)
- University of Groningen (RUG)
- Leiden University (LU)
- Leiden University Medical Center (LUMC)
- Delft University of Technology (TU Delft)
- Radboud University Nijmegen (RUN)
- University of Amsterdam (UvA)
- Academic Medical Center (AMC)
- Wageningen University and Research Centre (WUR/PRI)
- Erasmus MC
- Dutch Cancer Institute (NKI)
- Dutch Vaccin Institute (NVI)
- AMOLF
- Hubrecht Institute

== Board ==
- Albert Heck
- Werner Most
- Geert Kops
- Hermen Overkleeft
- Bert Poolman
- Rob Liskamp
