= Frank H. Field =

American chemist and mass spectrometrist

Frank Henry Field
- Born: February 27, 1922; Keansburg, New Jersey
- Died: April 12, 2013 (aged 91); Durham, North Carolina
- Education: Duke University
- Known for: Chemical ionization
- Scientific career
- Workplaces: University of Texas; Humble Oil; Esso; Rockefeller University

Frank Henry Field (February 27, 1922 – April 12, 2013) was an American chemist and mass spectrometrist known for his work in the development of chemical ionization.

== Early life and education ==
Frank Field was born in Keansburg, New Jersey, on February 27, 1922. His father died two months after he was born and his mother died in 1933, after which he was raised by his aunt in Cliffside Park, New Jersey. He attended Duke University, where he studied chemistry, receiving his B.S. degree in chemistry in 1943, M.S. in 1944, and Ph.D. in 1948.

== Professional career ==
Field took a position as an instructor at the University of Texas at Austin in 1947 and became an assistant professor in 1949. In 1952, he took a position as a research chemist at Humble Oil in Baytown, Texas, where he, along with Burnaby Munson, discovered chemical ionization. In 1966, he moved to Esso Research and Development Company in Linden, New Jersey, where he rose through the ranks to become a senior research associate. In 1970 he took a position as a professor at Rockefeller University and became emeritus in 1989.

== Awards and honors ==
Field was a Guggenheim Fellow in 1963–1964 and was president of the American Society for Mass Spectrometry from 1972 to 1974. In 1987 he became a fellow of the American Association for the Advancement of Science. The Frank H. Field and Joe L. Franklin Award for Outstanding Achievement in Mass Spectrometry, given by the American Chemical Society, was created in 1983. Field received the award in 1988.
