= Société chimique de France =

Société Chimique de France
- Formation: 1857
- Type: Learned society
- Headquarters: Paris
- Location: France
- Official language: French
- Website: www.societechimiquedefrance.fr

The Société Chimique de France (SCF) is a learned society and professional association founded in 1857 to represent the interests of French chemists in a variety of ways in local, national and international contexts. Until 2009 the organization was known as the Société Française de Chimie.

== History ==
The Society traces its origins back to an organization of young Parisian chemists who began meeting in May 1857 under the name Société Chimique, with the goal of self-study and mutual education. In 1858 the established chemist Adolphe Wurtz joined the society, now named the Société Chimique de Paris, and immediately transformed it into a learned society modeled after the Chemical Society of London, which was the precursor of the Royal Society of Chemistry. Like its British counterpart, the French association sought to foster the communication of new ideas and facts throughout France and across international borders. In 1906, the society changed its name from Société Chimique de Paris to Société Chimique de France; in 1983 it became the Société Française de Chimie; and in 2009 it returned to the name Société Chimique de France.

== Activities ==
Support for the Bulletin de la Société Chimique de Paris began in 1858.

In the 21st century, the society has become a member of European Chemical Society, which is an organization of 16 European chemical societies. This European consortium was established in the late 1990s as many chemical journals owned by national chemical societies were amalgamated. In 2010 they started ChemistryViews.org, their news and information service for chemists and other scientists worldwide.

=== Prizes and awards ===
The society acknowledges individual achievement with prizes and awards, including:

- Raymond Berr Prize

- 1954: Charles Glacet
- 1955: Raymond Jean Calas
- 1958: Guy Ourisson
- 1961: Marc Julia
- 1965: Robert Collongues
- 1967: Jean-Pierre Ebel
- 1970: Pierre Potier
- 1972: Jean Flahaut
- 1976: Henri B. Kagan
- 1978: Jean-Marie Lehn
- 1979: J. P. Kovalevsky
- 1981: Bernard Trémillon
- 1985: Philippe Sautet
- 1988: François Mathey
- 1993: Pierre Sigwalt

- Lavoisier Medal of the Société Chimique de France is awarded to a person or institution in order to distinguish the work or actions which have enhanced the perceived value of chemistry in society.

- 1904: James Dewar
- 1906: William Perkin
- 1912: Victor Grignard
- 1922: Theodore William Richards
- 1935: Cyril Norman Hinshelwood
- 1948: Alexander R. Todd, Baron Todd
- 1949: Rudolf Signer
- 1954: Iraj Lalezari
- 1955: Karl Ziegler
- 1968: Robert Burns Woodward
- 1983: Paul B. Weisz
- 1992: Marc Julia and Raymond Wey
- 1993: William M. Hess, Armand Lattes, Ernest Maréchal, Eugène Papirer and L.-A. Plaquette
- 1994: David A. Evans; Marco Aurelio de Paoli; Rudolph Marcus; Steven Wolff
- 1995: Derek Barton; Rudolf Hoppe
- 1997: Jean-Marie Lehn
- 1998: Jean-Baptiste Donnet
- 1999: Gesellschaft Deutscher Chemiker (GDCh)
- 2000: F. Albert Cotton
- 2004: Fred McLafferty
- 2013: Gérard Férey
- 2015: Jacques Livage, Henri B. Kagan
- 2018: Christian Amatore
- 2023: Jean-Marie Tarascon

== See also ==
- List of engineering awards
- List of chemistry awards
- List of chemistry societies
- Royal Society of Chemistry, 1841
- Deutsche Chemische Gesellschaft, 1867
- American Chemical Society, 1876
- Chemical Society of Japan, 1878
