= Timeline of crystallography =

This is a timeline of crystallography.

== 17th century ==
- 1669 - In his book De solido intra solidum naturaliter contento Nicolas Steno asserted that, although the number and size of crystal faces may vary from one crystal to another, the angles between corresponding faces are always the same. This was the original statement of the first law of crystallography (Steno's law).

== 18th century ==
- 1723 - Moritz Anton Cappeller introduced the term crystallography in his book Prodromus Crystallographiae De Crystallis Improprie Sic Dictis Commentarium.
- 1766 - Pierre-Joseph Macquer, in his Dictionnaire de Chymie, promoted mechanisms of crystallization based on the idea that crystals are composed of polyhedral molecules (primitive integrantes).
- 1772 - Jean-Baptiste L. Romé de l'Isle developed geometrical ideas on crystal structure in his Essai de Cristallographie. He also described the twinning phenomenon in crystals.
- 1781 - Abbé René Just Haüy (often termed the "Father of Modern Crystallography") discovered that crystals always cleave along crystallographic planes. Based on this observation, and the fact that the inter-facial angles in each crystal species always have the same value, Haüy concluded that crystals must be periodic and composed of regularly arranged rows of tiny polyhedra (molécules intégrantes). This theory explained why all crystal planes are related by small rational numbers (the law of rational indices).
- 1783 - Jean-Baptiste L. Romé de l'Isle in the second edition of his Cristallographie used the contact goniometer to discover the law of constancy of interfacial angles: angles are constant and characteristic for crystals of the same chemical substance.
- 1784 - René Just Haüy published his law of decrements: a crystal is composed of molecules arranged periodically in three dimensions.
- 1795 - René Just Haüy lectured on his law of symmetry: "the manner in which Nature creates crystals is always obeying ... the law of the greatest possible symmetry, in the sense that oppositely situated but corresponding parts are always equal in number, arrangement, and form of their faces".

== 19th century ==
- 1801 - René Just Haüy published his multi-volume Traité de Minéralogie in Paris. A second edition under the title Traité de Cristallographie was published in 1822.
- 1801 - Déodat de Dolomieu published his Sur la philosophie minéralogique et sur l'espèce minéralogique in Paris.
- 1815 - René Just Haüy published his law of symmetry.
- 1815 - Christian Samuel Weiss, founder of the dynamist school of crystallography, developed a geometric treatment of crystals in which crystallographic axes are the basis for classification of crystals rather than Haüy's polyhedral molecules.
- 1819 - Eilhard Mitscherlich discovered crystallographic isomorphism.
- 1822 - Friedrich Mohs attempted to bring the molecular approach of Haüy and the geometric approach of Weiss into agreement.
- 1823 - Franz Ernst Neumann invented a system of crystal face notation, by using the reciprocals of the intercepts with crystal axes, which becomes the standard for the next 60 years.
- 1824 - Ludwig August Seeber conceived of the concept of using an array of discrete (molecular) points to represent a crystal.
- 1826 - Moritz Ludwig Frankenheim derived the 32 crystal classes by using the crystallographic restriction, consistent with Haüy's laws, that only 2, 3, 4 and 6-fold rotational axes are permitted.
- 1830 - Johann F. C. Hessel published an independent geometrical derivation of the 32 point groups (crystal classes).
- 1832 - Friedrich Wöhler and Justus von Liebig discovered polymorphism in molecular crystals, using the example of benzamide.
- 1839 - William Hallowes Miller invented zonal relations by projecting the faces of a crystal upon the surface of a circumscribed sphere. Miller indices are defined which form a notation system in crystallography for planes in crystal (Bravais) lattices.
- 1840 - Gabriel Delafosse, independently of Seeber, represented crystal structure as an array of discrete points generated by defined translations.
- 1842 - Moritz Frankenheim derived 15 different theoretical networks of points in space not dependent on molecular shape.
- 1848 - Louis Pasteur discovered that sodium ammonium tartrate can crystallize in left- and right-handed forms and showed that the two forms can rotate polarized light in opposite directions. This was the first demonstration of molecular chirality, and also the first explanation of isomerism.
- 1850 - Auguste Bravais derived the 14 space lattices.
- 1869 - Axel Gadolin, independently of Hessel, derived the 32 crystal classes using stereographic projection.
- 1877 - Paul Heinrich von Groth founded the journal Zeitschrift für Krystallographie und Mineralogie, and served as its editor for 44 years.
- 1877 - Ernest-François Mallard, building on the work of Auguste Bravais, published a memoir on optically "anomalous" crystals (that is, those crystals the morphology of which seems to be of greater symmetry than their optics), in which the importance of crystal twinning and "pseudosymmetry" were used as explanatory concepts.
- 1879 - Leonhard Sohncke listed the 65 crystallographic point systems using rotations and reflections in addition to translations.
- 1888 - Friedrich Reinitzer discovered the existence of liquid crystals during investigations of cholesteryl benzoate.
- 1889 - Otto Lehmann, after receiving a letter from Friedrich Reinitzer, used polarizing light to explain the phenomenon of liquid crystals.
- 1891 - Derivation of the 230 space groups (by adding mirror-image symmetry to Sohncke's work) by a collaborative effort of Evgraf Fedorov and Arthur Schoenflies.
- 1894 - William Barlow, using a method based on patterns of oriented motifs, independently derived the 230 space groups.
- 1894 - Pierre Curie described the now called Curie's principle for the symmetry properties of crystals.
- 1895 - Wilhelm Conrad Röntgen on 8 November 1895 produced and detected electromagnetic radiation in a wavelength range now known as X-rays or Röntgen rays, an achievement that earned him the first Nobel Prize in Physics in 1901. X-rays became the major mode of crystallographic research in the 20th century.
- 1899 - Hermanus Haga and Cornelis Wind observed X-ray diffuse broadening through a slit and deduced that the wavelength of X-rays is on the order of an angstrom.

== 20th century ==
- 1905 - Charles Glover Barkla discovered the X-ray polarization effect.
- 1908 - Bernhard Walter and Robert Wichard Pohl observed X-ray diffraction from a slit.
- 1912 - Max von Laue discovered diffraction patterns from crystals in an X-ray beam.
- 1912 - Bragg diffraction, expressed through Bragg's law, is first presented by Lawrence Bragg on 11 November 1912 to the Cambridge Philosophical Society.
- 1912 - Heinrich Baumhauer discovered and described polytypism in crystals of carborundum, or silicon carbide.
- 1913 - Lawrence Bragg published the first observation of X-ray diffraction by crystals. Similar observations were also published by Torahiko Terada in the same year.
- 1913 - Georges Friedel stated Friedel's law, a property of Fourier transforms of real functions. Friedel's law is used in X-ray diffraction, crystallography and scattering from real potential within the Born approximation.
- 1914 - Max von Laue won the Nobel Prize in Physics "for his discovery of the diffraction of X-rays by crystals."
- 1915 - William and Lawrence Bragg published the book X rays and crystal structure and shared the Nobel Prize in Physics "for their services in the analysis of crystal structure by means of X-rays."
- 1916 - Peter Debye and Paul Scherrer discovered powder (polycrystalline) diffraction.
- 1916 - Paul Peter Ewald predicted the Pendellösung effect, which is a foundational aspect of the dynamical diffraction theory of X-rays.
- 1917 - Albert W. Hull independently discovered powder diffraction in researching the crystal structure of metals.
- 1920 - Reginald Oliver Herzog and Willi Jancke published the first systematic analysis of X-ray diffraction patterns of cellulose extracted from a variety of sources.
- 1921 - Paul Peter Ewald introduced a spherical construction for explaining the occurrence of diffraction spots, which is now called Ewald's sphere.
- 1922 - Charles Galton Darwin formulated the theory of X-ray diffraction from imperfect crystals and introduced the concept of mosaicity in crystallography.
- 1922 - Ralph Wyckoff published a book containing tables with the positional coordinates permitted by the symmetry elements. These positions are now known as Wyckoff positions. This book was the forerunner of the International tables for crystallography, which first appeared in 1935.
- 1923 - Roscoe Dickinson and Albert Raymond, and independently, H.J. Gonell and Hermann Mark, first showed that an organic molecule, specifically hexamethylenetetramine, could be characterized by X-ray crystallography.
- 1923 - William H. Bragg and Reginald E. Gibbs elucidated the structure of quartz.
- 1923 - Paul Peter Ewald published his book Kristalle und Röntgenstrahlen (Crystals and X-rays).
- 1924 - Louis de Broglie in his PhD thesis Recherches sur la théorie des quanta introduced his theory of electron waves. This was the start of electron and neutron diffraction and crystallography.
- 1924 - J.D. Bernal established the structure of graphite.
- 1926 - Victor Goldschmidt distinguished between atomic and ionic radii and postulated some rules for atom substitution in crystal structures.
- 1927 - Frits Zernike and Jan Albert Prins proposed the pair distribution function for analyzing molecular structures in solution-phase diffraction.
- 1927 - Two groups demonstrated electron diffraction, the first the Davisson–Germer experiment, the other by George Paget Thomson and Alexander Reid. Alexander Reid, who was Thomson's graduate student, performed the first experiments, but he died soon after in a motorcycle accident.
- 1928 - Felix Machatschki, working with Goldschmidt, showed that silicon can be replaced by aluminium in feldspar structures.
- 1928 - Kathleen Lonsdale used X-rays to determine that the structure of benzene is a flat hexagonal ring.
- 1928 - Paul Niggli introduced reduced cells for simplifying structures using a technique now known as Niggli reduction.
- 1928 - Hans Bethe published the first non-relativistic explanation of electron diffraction based upon Schrödinger's equation, which remains central to all further analysis.
- 1928 - Carl Hermann introduced and Charles Mauguin modified the international standard notation for crystallographic groups called Hermann–Mauguin notation.
- 1929 - Linus Pauling formulated a set of rules (later called Pauling's rules) to describe the structure of complex ionic crystals.
- 1929 - William Howard Barnes published the crystal structure of ice.
- 1930 - Lawrence Bragg assembled the first classification of silicates, describing their structure in terms of grouping of SiO_{4} tetrahedra.
- 1930 - Gas electron diffraction was developed by Herman Mark and Raymond Wierl,
- 1931 - Paul Ewald and Carl Hermann published the first volume of the Strukturbericht (Structure Report), which established the systematic classification of crystal structure prototypes, also known as the Strukturbericht designation.
- 1931 - Fritz Laves enumerated the Laves tilings for the first time.
- 1932 - W. H. Zachariasen published an article entitled The atomic arrangement in glass, which perhaps had more influence than any other published work on the science of glass.
- 1932 - Friedrich Rinne introduced the concept of paracrystallinity for liquid crystals and amorphous materials.
- 1932 - Vadim E. Lashkaryov and Ilya D. Usyskin determined of the positions of hydrogen atoms in ammonium chloride crystals using electron diffraction.
- 1934 - Arthur Patterson introduced the Patterson function which uses diffraction intensities to determine the interatomic distances within a crystal, setting limits to the possible phase values for the reflected X-rays.
- 1934 - Martin Julian Buerger developed the equi-inclination Weissenberg X-ray camera. Buerger invented the precession camera in 1942.
- 1934 - C. Arnold Beevers and Henry Lipson invented the Beevers–Lipson strip as a calculation aid for Fourier methods for the determination of the crystal structure of CuSO_{4}.5H_{2}O.
- 1934 - Fritz Laves investigated the structures of intermetallic compounds of formula AB_{2}. These structures were subsequently named Laves phases.
- 1935 - First publication of the International tables for the determination of crystal structures edited by Carl Hermann. The successor volumes are currently published by IUCr as the International tables for crystallography.
- 1935 - William Astbury established the structure of keratin using X-ray crystallography; this work provided the foundation for Linus Pauling's 1951 discovery of the α-helix.
- 1936 - Peter Debye won the Nobel Prize in Chemistry "for his contributions to our knowledge of molecular structure through his investigations on dipole moments and on the diffraction of X-rays and electrons in gases."
- 1936 - Hans Boersch showed that electron microscope could be used as micro-diffraction cameras with an aperture—the birth of selected area electron diffraction.
- 1937 - Clinton Joseph Davisson and George Paget Thomson shared the Nobel Prize in physics "for their experimental discovery of the diffraction of electrons by crystals."
- 1939 - Linus Pauling published the book The Nature of the Chemical Bond and the Structure of Molecules and Crystals.
- 1939 - André Guinier discovered small-angle X-ray scattering.
- 1939 - Walther Kossel and Gottfried Möllenstedt published the first work on convergent beam electron diffraction (CBED), It was extended by Peter Goodman and Gunter Lehmpfuhl, then mainly by the groups of John Steeds and Michiyoshi Tanaka who showed how to use CBED patterns to determine point groups and space groups.
- 1941 - The International Centre for Diffraction Data was founded.
- 1945 - George W. Brindley and Keith Robinson solved the crystal structure of kaolinite.
- 1945 - The crystal structure of the perovskite BaTiO_{3} was first published by Helen Megaw based on barium titanate X-ray diffraction data.
- 1945 - A.F. Wells published the classic reference book, Structural inorganic chemistry, which subsequently went through five editions.
- 1946 - Foundation of the International Union of Crystallography.
- 1946 - James Batcheller Sumner shared the Nobel Prize in Chemistry "for his discovery that enzymes can be crystallized".
- 1947 - Lewis Stephen Ramsdell systematically classified the polytypes of silicon carbide, and introduced the Ramsdell notation.
- 1948 - The first congress and general assembly of the International Union of Crystallography was held at Harvard University.
- 1948 - Acta Crystallographica was founded by the International Union of Crystallography (IUCr) with P.P. Ewald as its first editor.
- 1948 - Ernest O. Wollan and Clifford Shull published the first series of neutron diffraction experiments for crystallography performed at the Oak Ridge National Laboratory.
- 1948 - George Pake used solid state NMR spectroscopy to determine hydrogen atom distances in a single crystal of gypsum.
- 1949 - Clifford Shull opened a new field of magnetic crystallography based on neutron diffraction.
- 1950 - Jerome Karle and Herbert A. Hauptman introduced formulae for phase determination known as direct methods.
- 1951 - Johannes Martin Bijvoet and his colleagues, using anomalous scattering, confirmed Emil Fischer's arbitrary assignment of absolute configuration, in relation to the direction of optical rotation of polarized light, was correct in practice.
- 1951 - Linus Pauling determined the structure of the α-helix and the β-sheet in polypeptide chains.
- 1951 - Alexei Vasilievich Shubnikov published Symmetry and antisymmetry of finite figures which opened up the field of antisymmetry in magnetic structures.
- 1952 - David Sayre suggested that the phase problem could be more easily solved by having at least one more intensity measurement beyond those of the Bragg peaks in each dimension. This concept is understood today as oversampling.
- 1952 - Geoffrey Wilkinson and Ernst Otto Fischer determined the structure of ferrocene, the first metallic sandwich compound, for which they won the 1973 Nobel prize in Chemistry. The structure was soon refined by Jack Dunitz, Leslie Orgel, and Alexander Rich.
- 1953 - Arne Magnéli introduced the term homologous series to describe polytypes of transition metal oxides that exhibit crystallographic shear structures.
- 1953 - Determination of the structure of DNA by three British teams, for which James Watson, Francis Crick and Maurice Wilkins won the 1962 Nobel Prize in Physiology or Medicine in 1962 (Franklin's death in 1958 made her ineligible for the award).
- 1954 - Ukichiro Nakaya's book Snow Crystals: Natural and Artificial, dedicated to the modern study of snow crystals, is published.
- 1954 - Linus Pauling won the Nobel Prize in Chemistry "for his research into the nature of the chemical bond and its application to the elucidation of the structure of complex substances"."
- 1956 - Durward W. J. Cruickshank developed the theoretical framework for anisotropic displacement parameters, also known as the thermal ellipsoid.
- 1956 - James Menter published the first electron microscope images showing the lattice structure of a material.
- 1958 - William Burton Pearson published A Handbook of Lattice Spacings and Structures of Metals and Alloys, where he introduced the Pearson symbols for crystal structure types.
- 1959 - Norio Kato and Andrew Richard Lang observed Pendellösung fringes in X-ray diffraction from silicon and quartz. The observation of similar fringes in neutron diffraction was made by Clifford Shull in 1968.
- 1960 - John Kendrew determined the structure of myoglobin for which he shared the 1962 Nobel Prize in Chemistry.
- 1960 - After many years of research, Max Perutz determined the structure of haemoglobin for which he shared the 1962 Nobel Prize in Chemistry.
- 1960 - Lester Germer and his coworkers at Bell Labs using a flat phosphor screen for the first modern low-energy electron diffraction camera combined with ultra-high vacuum, the start of quantitative surface crystallography.
- 1962 - Alan Mackay demonstrated that there exists close packing of spheres to yield icosahedral structures.
- 1962 - Michael Rossmann and David Blow laid the foundation for the molecular replacement approach which provides phase information without requiring additional experimental effort.
- 1962 - Max Perutz and John Kendrew shared the Nobel Prize for Chemistry "for their studies of the structures of globular proteins", namely haemoglobin and myoglobin respectively
- 1962 - James Watson, Francis Crick and Maurice Wilkins won the Nobel Prize in Physiology or Medicine "for their discoveries concerning the molecular structure of nucleic acids and its significance for information transfer in living material," specifically for their determination of the structure of DNA.
- 1963 - Isabella Karle developed the symbolic addition procedure in direct methods for inverting X-ray diffraction data.
- 1963 - Jürg Waser introduced restrained least square method, also known as regularized least squares, for crystallographic structure fitting.
- 1964 - Dorothy Hodgkin won the Nobel Prize for Chemistry "for her determinations by X-ray techniques of the structures of important biochemical substances." The substances included penicillin and vitamin B12.
- 1965 - David Chilton Phillips, Louise Johnson and their co-workers published the structure of Lysozyme, the first enzyme to have its structure determined.
- 1965 - Olga Kennard established the Cambridge Structural Database.
- 1967 - Hugo Rietveld invented the Rietveld refinement method for computation of crystal structures.
- 1968 - Erwin Félix Lewy-Bertaut introduced magnetic space groups to account for the spin ordering of magnetic structures observed in neutron crystallography.
- 1968 - Aaron Klug and David DeRosier used electron microscopy to visualise the structure of the tail of bacteriophage T4, a common virus, thus signalling a breakthrough in macromolecular structure determination.
- 1968 - Dorothy Hodgkin, after 35 years of work, finally deciphered the structure of insulin.
- 1969 - Benno P. Schoenborn conducted the first structural study of macromolecules (myoglobin) by neutron diffraction at the Brookhaven National Laboratory.
- 1970 - Albert Crewe demonstrated imaging of single atoms in a scanning transmission electron microscopy.
- 1971 - Establishment of the Protein Data Bank (PDB). At PDB, Edgar Meyer develops the first general software tools for handling and visualizing protein structural data.
- 1971 - Gerd Rosenbaum, Kenneth Holmes, and Jean Witz first discussed the potential of synchrotron X-ray diffraction for biological applications.
- 1972 - The first quantitative matching of atomic scale images and dynamical simulations was published by J. G. Allpress, E. A. Hewat, A. F. Moodie and J. V. Sanders.
- 1972 - Michael Glazer established the classification of octahedral tilting patterns in perovskite crystal structures, later also known as the Glazer tilts.
- 1973 - Alex Rich's group published the first report of a polynucleotide crystal structure - that of the yeast transfer RNA (tRNA) for phenylalanine.
- 1973 - Geoffrey Wilkinson and Ernst Fischer shared the Nobel Prize in Chemistry "for their pioneering work, performed independently, on the chemistry of the organometallic, so called sandwich compounds", specifically the structure of ferrocene.
- 1976 - Douglas L. Dorset and Herbert A. Hauptman used direct methods to solve crystal structures from electron diffraction data.
- 1976 - Boris Delaunay, building on his work in the 1930s, proved that the regularity of a system of points, an (r, R) system or Delone set, can be established by postulating the points' congruence within a sphere of a defined finite radius.
- 1976 - William Lipscomb won the Nobel Prize in Chemistry "for his studies on the structure of boranes illuminating problems of chemical bonding."
- 1978 - Stephen C. Harrison provided the first high-resolution structure of a virus: tomato bushy stunt virus which is icosahedral in form.
- 1978 - Günter Bergerhoff and I. David Brown initiated the Inorganic Crystal Structure Database.
- 1979 - The first award of the Gregori Aminoff Prize for a contribution in the field of crystallography is made by the Royal Swedish Academy of Sciences to Paul Peter Ewald.
- 1979 - A team involving Alfred Y. Cho and others at Bell Labs made the first reconstruction of atomic structures at the materials interface between gallium arsenide and aluminium using X-ray diffraction.
- 1980 - Jerome Karle and Wayne Hendrickson developed multi-wavelength anomalous dispersion (MAD) a technique to facilitate the determination of the three-dimensional structure of biological macromolecules via a solution of the phase problem.
- 1982 - Aaron Klug won the Nobel Prize in Chemistry "for his development of crystallographic electron microscopy and his structural elucidation of biologically important nucleic acid-protein complexes."
- 1983 - John R. Helliwell promoted the use of synchrotron radiation in the crystallography of molecular biology.
- 1983 - Effectively simultaneously Ian Robinson used surface X-ray Diffraction (SXRD) to solve the structure of the gold 2x1 (110) surface, Laurence D. Marks used electron microscopy and Gerd Binnig and Heinrich Rohrer used scanning tunneling microscope.
- 1984 - A team led by Dan Shechtman also involving Ilan Blech, Denis Gratias, and John W. Cahn discovered quasicrystals in a metallic alloy. These structures have no unit cell and no periodic translational order but have long-range bond orientational order, which generates a defined diffraction pattern.
- 1984 - Aaron Klug and his colleagues provided an advance in determining the structure of protein–nucleic acid complexes when they solved the structure of the 206-kDa nucleosome core particle.
- 1985 - Jerome Karle shared the Nobel Prize in Chemistry with Herbert A. Hauptman "for their outstanding achievements in the development of direct methods for the determination of crystal structures". Karle developed the theoretical basis for multiple-wavelength anomalous diffraction (MAD).
- 1985 - Hartmut Michel and his colleagues reported the first high-resolution X-ray crystal structure of an integral membrane protein when they published the structure of a photosynthetic reaction centre.
- 1985 - Kunio Takanayagi led a team which solved the structure of the 7x7 reconstruction of the silicon (111) surface using Patterson function methods with ultra-high vacuum electron diffraction. This surface structure had defeated many prior attempts.
- 1986 - Ernst Ruska shared the Nobel Prize in Physics "for his fundamental work in electron optics, and for the design of the first electron microscope".
- 1987 - John M. Cowley and Alexander F. Moodie shared the first IUCr Ewald Prize "for their outstanding achievements in electron diffraction and microscopy. They carried out pioneering work on the dynamical scattering of electrons and the direct imaging of crystal structures and structure defects by high-resolution electron microscopy. The physical optics approach used by Cowley and Moodie takes into account many hundreds of scattered beams, and represents a far-reaching extension of the dynamical theory for X-rays, first developed by P.P. Ewald".
- 1987 - Don Craig Wiley and Jack L. Strominger solved the structure of the soluble portion of a class I MHC molecule known as HLA-A2. This structure revealed the presence of a pocket which holds the antigenic peptide, which is recognized by the receptors of T cells only when firmly bound to the MHC product and presented at the surface of an infected cell. This structure strongly influenced the concept of T cell recognition in future work.
- 1988 - Johann Deisenhofer, Robert Huber and Hartmut Michel shared the Nobel Prize in Chemistry "for the determination of the three-dimensional structure of a photosynthetic reaction centre."
- 1989 - Gautam R. Desiraju defined crystal engineering as "the understanding of intermolecular interactions in the context of crystal packing and the utilization of such understanding in the design of new solids with desired physical and chemical properties."
- 1991 - Georg E. Schulz and colleagues reported the structure of a bacterial porin, a membrane protein with a cylindrical shape (a ‘β-barrel').
- 1991 - The crystallographic information file (CIF) format was introduced by Sydney R. Hall, Frank H. Allen, and I. David Brown based on the self-defining text archive and retrieval (STAR) file format developed by Sydney R. Hall.
- 1991 - Sumio Iijima used electron diffraction to determine the structure of carbon nanotubes.
- 1992 - The International Union of Crystallography changed the IUCr's definition of a crystal to "any solid having an essentially discrete diffraction pattern" thus formally recognizing quasicrystals.
- 1992 - First release of the CNS software package by Axel T. Brunger. CNS is an extension of X-PLOR released in 1987, and is used for solving structures based on X-ray diffraction or solution NMR data.
- 1994 - Jan Pieter Abrahams et al. reported the structure of an F1-ATPase which uses the proton-motive force across the inner mitochondrial membrane to facilitate the synthesis of adenosine triphosphate (ATP).
- 1994 - Roger Vincent and Paul Midgley invented the precession electron diffraction method for electron crystallography in a transmission electron microscope.
- 1994 - Bertram Brockhouse and Clifford Shull shared the Nobel Prize in Physics "for pioneering contributions to the development of neutron scattering techniques for studies of condensed matter". Specifically, Brockhouse "for the development of neutron spectroscopy" and Shull "for the development of the neutron diffraction technique."
- 1994 - Philip Coppens led a team of researchers to uncover the transient structure of sodium nitroprusside, a first example in X-ray excited-state crystallography.
- 1995 - Douglas L. Dorset published Structural Electron Crystallography, a major text on electron crystallography.
- 1997 - The Bilbao Crystallographic Server was launched at the University of the Basque Country, led by Mois Ilia Aroyo, Juan Manuel Perez-Mato.
- 1997 - The X-ray crystal structure of bacteriorhodopsin was the first time the lipidic cubic phase (LCP) was used to facilitate the crystallization of a membrane protein; LCP has since been used to obtain the structures of many unique membrane proteins, including G protein-coupled receptors (GPCRs).
- 1997 - Paul D. Boyer and John E. Walker shared one half of the Nobel Prize in Chemistry "for their elucidation of the enzymatic mechanism underlying the synthesis of adenosine triphosphate (ATP)" Walker determined the crystal structure of ATP synthase, and this structure confirmed a mechanism earlier proposed by Boyer, mainly on the basis of isotopic studies.
- 1997 - Nobuo Niimura led a team that first used a neutron image plate for structure determination of lysozyme at the Institut Laue–Langevin.
- 1998 - The structure of tubulin and the location of the taxol-binding site is first determined by Eva Nogales and her team using electron crystallography.
- 1998 - A group led by Jon Gjønnes combined three-dimensional electron diffraction with precession electron diffraction and direct methods to solve an intermetallic, combining this with dynamical refinements.
- 1999 - Jianwei Miao, Janos Kirz, David Sayre and co-workers performed the first experiment to extend crystallography to allow structural determination of non-crystalline specimens which has become known as coherent diffraction imaging (CDI), lensless imaging, or computational microscopy.
- 1999 - A team led by Michael O'Keefe and Omar Yaghi synthesized and determined the structure of MOF-5, the first metal-organic framework (MOF) compound. In the ensuing years, the duo and mathematician Olaf Delgado-Friedrichs further developed the periodic net theory proposed by Alexander F. Wells to characterize MOFs.

== 21st century ==
- 2000 - Janos Hajdu, Richard Neutze, and colleagues calculated that they could use Sayre's ideas from the 1950s, to implement a ‘diffraction before destruction' concept, using an X-ray free-electron laser (XFEL).
- 2001 - Harry F. Noller's group published the 5.5-Å structure of the complete Thermus thermophilus 70S ribosome. This structure revealed that the major functional regions of the ribosome were based on RNA, establishing the primordial role of RNA in translation.
- 2001 - Roger Kornberg's group published the 2.8-Å structure of Saccharomyces cerevisiae RNA polymerase. The structure allowed both transcription initiation and elongation mechanisms to be deduced. Simultaneously, this group reported the structure of free RNA polymerase II, which contributed towards the eventual visualisation of the interaction between DNA, RNA, and the ribosome.
- 2003 - Raimond Ravelli et al. demonstrated X-ray radiation damage-induced phasing method for structure determination.
- 2005 - The first X-ray free-electron laser in the soft X-ray regime, FLASH, became an operational user facility at DESY for X-ray diffraction experiments.
- 2007 - Ute Kolb and co-workers developed automated diffraction tomography for electron crystallography by combining diffraction and tomography within a transmission electron microscope.
- 2007 - Two X-ray crystal structures of a GPCR, the human β2 adrenergic receptor, were published. Because many drugs elicit their biological effect(s) by binding to a GPCR, the structures of these and other GPCRs may be used to develop efficacious drugs with few side effects.
- 2009 - The first hard X-ray free-electron laser, the Linac Coherent Light Source, became operational at the SLAC National Accelerator Laboratory.
- 2009 - Luca Bindi, Paul Steinhardt, Nan Yao, and Peter Lu identified the first naturally occurring quasicrystal using X-ray and electron crystallography.
- 2009 - Venkatraman Ramakrishnan, Thomas A. Steitz and Ada E. Yonath shared the Nobel Prize in Chemistry "for studies of the structure and function of the ribosome."
- 2009 - Judith Howard and her collaborators created the Olex2 crystallographic software package.
- 2011 - Gustaaf Van Tendeloo led a team including Sandra Van Aert, Kees Joost Batenburg et al. determined the 3D atomic positions of a silver nanoparticle using electron tomography.
- 2011 - Dan Shechtman received the Nobel Prize in chemistry "for the discovery of quasicrystals."
- 2011 - Henry N. Chapman, Petra Fromme, John C. H. Spence and 85 co-workers used femtosecond pulses from a Free-electron laser (XFEL) to examine the structure of nanocrystals of Photosystem I. By using very brief X-ray pulses, most radiation damage is mitigated using the technique called serial femtosecond crystallography.
- 2012 - Jianwei Miao and his co-workers applied the coherent diffraction imaging (CDI) method in Atomic Electron Tomography (AET).
- 2013 - Tamir Gonen and his co-workers demonstrated microcrystal electron diffraction (microED) for lysozyme microcrystals at the Janelia Farm Research Campus.
- 2014 - Carmelo Giacovazzo published Phasing in Crystallography: A Modern Perspective, a comprehensive opus on phasing methods in X-ray and electron crystallography.
- 2014 - The International Union of Crystallography and UNESCO named 2014 the International Year of Crystallography to commemorate the century of discovery since the invention of X-ray diffraction.
- 2017 - Lukas Palatinus and co-workers used dynamical structure refinement to resolve hydrogen atom positions in nanocrystals using electron diffraction.
- 2017 - Jacques Dubochet, Joachim Frank and Richard Henderson shared the Nobel Prize in chemistry "for developing cryo-electron microscopy for the high-resolution structure determination of biomolecules in solution."
- 2019 - The Cambridge Structural Database reached the milestone of one million structures.
- 2020 - Two independent groups led respectively by Holger Stark and Sjors Scheres demonstrated that single-particle cryoelectron microscopy has reached atomic resolution.
- 2021 - Kenneth G. Libbrecht published the book Snow Crystals: A Case Study in Spontaneous Structure Formation, summarizing his decade-spanning work on the subject for engineering conditions for designer ice crystals.
- 2022 - Leonid Dubrovinsky, Igor A. Abrikosov, and Natalia Dubrovinskaia led a team that demonstrates high-pressure crystallography in the terapascal regime.
- 2024 - A team led by Anders Madsen developed a deep learning model, PhAI, to solve the crystallographic phase problem for small molecules.

== See also ==
- History of crystallography before X-rays
  - Chemical
  - Geometrical
  - Physical
