= Norio Kato =

Japanese physicist and crystallographer (1923–2002)

Norio Kato (Japanese: 加藤 範夫, Kato Norio, March 10, 1923 – April 5, 2002) was a Japanese physicist and crystallographer. He was known for his contributions in diffraction topography and the dynamical theory of diffraction, including the validation of the Pendellösung effect and extensions to account for realistic scattering conditions.

== Education and career ==
Kato was born in Shanghai, China but received his education in Japan. He studied at Seikei Gakuen, where he was taught haiku by Nakamura Kusatao, which would become one of Kato's lifelong hobby. Kato entered University of Tokyo to study physics, where he obtained a BSc degree in 1944. He went on to study under the electron microscopist Ryoji Uyeda at Nagoya University, where he received a MSc in 1946 and a doctoral degree in physics in 1954. In 1950, Kato worked at the Kobayasi Institute of Physical Research (now part of RIKEN) under Shoji Nishikawa. After his PhD, Kato continued working at the Kobayasi institute before moving to the United States in 1957 as a Fulbright scholar to conduct postdoctoral research at Harvard University and later at University of Bristol in the UK. Kato published some of his most important works in this period, including the joint work with Andrew Richard Lang at Harvard University on the observation of the Pendellösung effect in quartz via X-ray diffraction.

Kato returned to Japan and Nagoya University in 1960 as an associate professor of Applied Physics and became a full professor in 1961. He later moved to the Department of Crystalline Materials Science of the same university and worked until his retirement in 1986. Afterwards, Kato moved to Meijo University, where he taught in the Department of Physics for more than ten years until 1998. Kato published textbooks in crystallography and X-ray diffraction in Japanese. His last book was about haiku, which came out in 2001.

== Honors and awards ==
Kato was an associate editor of the Journal of Crystal Growth from 1967 to 1977. He was a member of the executive committee of the International Union of Crystallography from 1968 to 1972. He is a recipient of the Chunichi cultural award in 1976. He received the Ewald Prize in 1993 for his contribution to the dynamical theory of diffraction and diffraction topography. He was president of the Crystallographic Society of Japan in 1982 and president of the International Union of Crystallography from 1978 to 1981, the first Asian to lead the international organization.

== Bibliography ==
- Kato, Norio, ed. (December 10, 1970). 結晶成長 (in Japanese). 日本物理学会.
- Kato, Norio (September 1, 1995). X線回折と構造評価 (in Japanese). 朝倉書店. ISBN 978-4-254-13626-5.
- Kato, Norio (January 1, 2001). 私は良寛です (in Japanese). 日本図書刊行会. ISBN 978-4-8231-0606-4.
