= Diffraction topography =

X-ray imaging technique

Diffraction topography (short: "topography") is an imaging technique based on Bragg diffraction. Diffraction topographic images ("topographies") record the intensity profile of a beam of X-rays (or, sometimes, neutrons) diffracted by a crystal. A topography thus represents a two-dimensional spatial intensity mapping (image) of the X-rays diffracted in a specific direction, so regions which diffract substantially will appear brighter than those which do not. This is equivalent to the spatial fine structure of an Laue reflection. Topographs often reveal the irregularities in a non-ideal crystal lattice. X-ray diffraction topography is one variant of X-ray imaging, making use of diffraction contrast rather than absorption contrast which is usually used in radiography and computed tomography (CT). Topography is exploited to a lesser extent with neutrons, and is the same concept as dark field imaging in an electron microscope.

Topography is used for monitoring crystal quality and visualizing defects in many different crystalline materials. It has proved helpful e.g. when developing new crystal growth methods, for monitoring growth and the crystal quality achieved, and for iteratively optimizing growth conditions. In many cases, topography can be applied without preparing or otherwise damaging the sample; it is therefore one variant of non-destructive testing.

== History ==
After the discovery of x-rays by Wilhelm Röntgen in 1895, and of the principles of X-ray diffraction by Laue and the Bragg family, it took several decades for the benefits of diffraction imaging to be fully recognized, and the first useful experimental techniques to be developed. The first systematic reports of laboratory topography techniques date from the early 1940s. In the 1950s and 1960s, topographic investigations played a role in detecting the nature of defects and improving crystal growth methods for germanium and (later) silicon as materials for semiconductor microelectronics.

For a more detailed account of the historical development of topography, see J.F. Kelly – "A brief history of X-ray diffraction topography".

From about the 1970s on, topography profited from the advent of synchrotron x-ray sources which provided considerably more intense x-ray beams, allowing shorter exposure times, better contrast, higher spatial resolution, and investigation of smaller samples or rapidly changing phenomena.

Initial applications of topography were mainly in the field of metallurgy, controlling the growth of better crystals of various metals. Topography was later extended to semiconductors, and generally to materials for microelectronics. A related field are investigations of materials and devices for X-ray optics, such as monochromator crystals made of Silicon, Germanium or Diamond, which need to be checked for defects prior to being used. Extensions of topography to organic crystals are somewhat more recent. Topography is applied today not only to volume crystals of any kind, including semiconductor wafers, but also to thin layers, entire electronic devices, as well as to organic materials such as protein crystals and others.

== Basic principle of topography ==
The basic working principle of diffraction topography is as follows: An incident, spatially extended beam (mostly of X-rays, or neutrons) impinges on a sample. The beam may be either monochromatic, i.e. consist one single wavelength of X-rays or neutrons, or polychromatic, i.e. composed of a mixture of wavelengths ("white beam" topography). Furthermore, the incident beam may be either parallel, consisting only of "rays" propagating all along nearly the same direction, or divergent/convergent, containing several more strongly different directions of propagation.

When the beam hits the crystalline sample, Bragg diffraction occurs, i.e. the incident wave is reflected by the atoms on certain lattice planes of the sample, if it hits those planes at the right Bragg angle. Diffraction from sample can take place either in reflection geometry (Bragg case), with the beam entering and leaving through the same surface, or in transmission geometry (Laue case). Diffraction gives rise to a diffracted beam, which will leave the sample and propagate along a direction differing from the incident direction by the scattering angle $2 \theta_B$.

The cross section of the diffracted beam may or may not be identical to that of the incident beam. In the case of strongly asymmetric reflections, the beam size (in the diffraction plane) is considerably expanded or compressed, with expansion occurring if the incidence angle is much smaller than the exit angle, and vice versa. Independently of this beam expansion, the relation of sample size to image size is given by the exit angle alone: The apparent lateral size of the sample features parallel to the exit surface is downscaled in the image by the projection effect of the exit angle.

A homogeneous sample (with a regular crystal lattice) would yield a homogeneous intensity distribution in the topograph (a "flat" image with no contrast). Intensity modulations (topographic contrast) arise from irregularities in the crystal lattice, originating from various kinds of defects such as

- voids and inclusions in the crystal
- phase boundaries (regions of different crystallographic phase, polytype, ...)
- defective areas, non-crystalline (amorphous) areas / inclusions
- cracks, surface scratches
- stacking faults
- dislocations, dislocation bundles
- grain boundaries, domain walls
- growth striations
- point defects or defect clusters
- crystal deformation
- strain fields

In many cases of defects such as dislocations, topography is not directly sensitive to the defects themselves (atomic structure of the dislocation core), but predominantly to the strain field surrounding the defect region.

== Theory ==
Theoretical descriptions of contrast formation in X-ray topography are largely based on the dynamical theory of diffraction. This framework is helpful in the description of many aspects of topographic image formation: entrance of an X-ray wavefield into a crystal, propagation of the wavefield inside the crystal, interaction of wavefield with crystal defects, altering of wavefield propagation by local lattice strains, diffraction, multiple scattering, absorption.

The theory is therefore often helpful in the interpretation of topographic images of crystal defects. The exact nature of a defect often cannot be deduced directly from the observed image (i.e., a "backwards calculation" is problematic). Instead, one has to make assumptions about the structure of the defect, deduce a hypothetical image from the assumed structure ("forward calculation", based on theory), and compare with the experimental image. If the match between both is not good enough, the assumptions have to be varied until sufficient correspondence is reached. Theoretical calculations, and in particular numerical simulations by computer based on this theory, are thus a valuable tool for the interpretation of topographic images.

=== Contrast mechanisms ===
The topographic image of a uniform crystal with a perfectly regular lattice, illuminated by a homogeneous beam, is uniform (no contrast). Contrast arises when distortions of the lattice (defects, tilted crystallites, strain) occur; when the crystal is composed of several different materials or phases; or when the thickness of the crystal changes across the image domain.

==== Structure factor contrast ====
The diffraction from a crystalline material, and thus the intensity of the diffracted beam, changes with the type and number of atoms inside the crystal unit cell. This fact is quantitatively expressed by the structure factor. Different materials have different structure factors, and similarly for different phases of the same material (e.g. for materials crystallizing in several different space groups). In samples composed of a mixture of materials/phases in spatially adjacent domains, the geometry of these domains can be resolved by topography. This is true, for example, also for twinned crystals, ferroelectric domains, and many others.

==== Orientation contrast ====
When a crystal is composed of crystallites with varying lattice orientation, topographic contrast arises: In plane-wave topography, only selected crystallites will be in diffracting position, thus yielding diffracted intensity only in some parts of the image. Upon sample rotation, these will disappear, and other crystallites will appear in the new topograph as strongly diffracting. In white-beam topography, all misoriented crystallites will be diffracting simultaneously (each at a different wavelength). However, the exit angles of the respective diffracted beams will differ, leading to overlapping regions of enhanced intensity as well as to shadows in the image, thus again giving rise to contrast.

While in the case of tilted crystallites, domain walls, grain boundaries etc. orientation contrast occurs on a macroscopic scale, it can also be generated more locally around defects, e.g. due to curved lattice planes around a dislocation core.

==== Extinction contrast ====
Another type of topographic contrast, extinction contrast, is slightly more complex. While the two above variants are explicable in simple terms based on geometrical theory (basically, the Bragg law) or kinematical theory of X-ray diffraction, extinction contrast can be understood based on dynamical theory.

Qualitatively, extinction contrast arises e.g. when the thickness of a sample, compared to the respective extinction length (Bragg case) or Pendelloesung length (Laue case), changes across the image. In this case, diffracted beams from areas of different thickness, having suffered different degrees of extinction, are recorded within the same image, giving rise to contrast. Topographists have systematically investigated this effect by studying wedge-shaped samples, of linearly varying thickness, allowing to directly record in one image the dependence of diffracted intensity on sample thickness as predicted by dynamical theory.

In addition to mere thickness changes, extinction contrast also arises when parts of a crystal are diffracting with different strengths, or when the crystal contains deformed (strained) regions. The governing quantity for an overall theory of extinction contrast in deformed crystals is called the effective misorientation

$\Delta \theta(\vec r) = \frac{1}{\vec h \cdot \cos \theta_B} \frac{\partial}{\partial s_{\vec h}} \left[ \vec h \cdot \vec u(\vec r)\right]$

where $\vec u(\vec r)$ is the displacement vector field, and $\vec s_0$ and $\vec s_{h}$ are the directions of the incident and diffracted beam, respectively.

In this way, different kinds of disturbances are "translated" into equivalent misorientation values, and contrast formation can be understood analogously to orientation contrast. For instance, a compressively strained material requires larger Bragg angles for diffraction at unchanged wavelength. To compensate for this and to reach diffraction conditions, the sample needs to be rotated, similarly as in the case of lattice tilts.

A simplified and more "transparent" formula taking into account the combined effect of tilts and strains onto contrast is the following:

$\Delta \theta(\vec r) = -\tan \theta_B \frac{\Delta d}{d}(\vec r) \pm \Delta \varphi(\vec r)$

==== Visibility of defects; types of defect images ====
To discuss the visibility of defects in topographic images according to theory, consider the exemplary case of a single dislocation: It will give rise to contrast in topography only if the lattice planes involved in diffraction are distorted in some way by the existence of the dislocation. This is true in the case of an edge dislocation if the scattering vector of the Bragg reflection used is parallel to the Burgers vector of the dislocation, or at least has a component in the plane perpendicular to the dislocation line, but not if it is parallel to the dislocation line. In the case of a screw dislocation, the scattering vector has to have a component along the Burgers vector, which is now parallel to dislocation line. As a rule of thumb, a dislocation will be invisible in a topograph if the vector product

$\mathbf{g} \cdot \mathbf{b}$

is zero. (A more precise rule will have to distinguish between screw and edge dislocations and to also take the direction of the dislocation line $l$ into account.

If a defect is visible, often there occurs not only one, but several distinct images of it on the topograph. Theory predicts three images of single defects: The so-called direct image, the kinematical image, and the intermediary image.

=== Spatial resolution; limiting effects ===
The spatial resolution achievable in topographic images can be limited by one or several of three factors: the resolution (grain or pixel size) of the detector, the experimental geometry, and intrinsic diffraction effects.

First, the spatial resolution of an image can obviously not be better than the grain size (in the case of film) or the pixel size (in the case of digital detectors) with which it was recorded. This is the reason why topography requires high-resolution X-ray films or CCD cameras with the smallest pixel sizes available today. Secondly, resolution can be additionally blurred by a geometric projection effect. If one point of the sample is a "hole" in an otherwise opaque mask, then the X-ray source, of finite lateral size S, is imaged through the hole onto a finite image domain given by the formula

$\Delta x = S \cdot \frac{d}{D} = \frac{S}{D} \cdot d$

where I is the spread of the image of one sample point in the image plane, D is the source-to-sample distance, and d is the sample-to-image distance. The ratio S/D corresponds to the angle (in radians) under which the source appears from the position of the sample (the angular source size, equivalent to the incident divergence at one sample point). The achievable resolution is thus best for small sources, large sample distances, and small detector distances. This is why the detector (film) needed to be placed very close to the sample in the early days of topography; only at synchrotrons, with their small S and (very) large D, could larger values of d finally be afforded, introducing much more flexibility into topography experiments.

Thirdly, even with perfect detectors and ideal geometric conditions, the visibility of special contrast features, such as the images of single dislocations, can be additionally limited by diffraction effects. A dislocation in a perfect crystal matrix gives rise to contrast only in those regions where the local orientation of the crystal lattice differs from average orientation by more than about the Darwin width of the Bragg reflection used. A quantitative description is provided by the dynamical theory of X-ray diffraction. As a result, and somehow counter-intuitively, the widths of dislocation images become narrower when the associated rocking curves are large. Thus, strong reflections of low diffraction order are particularly appropriate for topographic imaging. They permit topographists to obtain narrow, well-resolved images of dislocations, and to separate single dislocations even when the dislocation density in a material is rather high. In more unfavourable cases (weak, high-order reflections, higher photon energies), dislocation images become broad, diffuse, and overlap for high and medium dislocation densities. Highly ordered, strongly diffracting materials – like minerals or semiconductors – are generally unproblematic, whereas e.g. protein crystals are particularly challenging for topographic imaging.

Apart from the Darwin width of the reflection, the width of single dislocation images may additionally depend on the Burgers vector of the dislocation, i.e. both its length and its orientation (relative to the scattering vector), and, in plane wave topography, on the angular departure from the exact Bragg angle. The latter dependence follows a reciprocity law, meaning that dislocations images become narrower inversely as the angular distance grows. So-called weak beam conditions are thus favourable in order to obtain narrow dislocation images.

== Experimental realization – instrumentation ==
To conduct a topographic experiment, three groups of instruments are required: an x-ray source, potentially including appropriate x-ray optics; a sample stage with sample manipulator (diffractometer); and a two-dimensionally resolving detector (most often X-ray film or camera).

=== X-ray source ===
The x-ray beam used for topography is generated by an x-ray source, typically either a laboratory x-ray tube (fixed or rotating) or a synchrotron source. The latter offers advantages due to its higher beam intensity, lower divergence, and its continuous wavelength spectrum. X-ray tubes are still useful, however, due to easier access and continuous availability, and are often used for initial screening of samples and/or training of new staff.

For white beam topography, not much more is required: most often, a set of slits to precisely define the beam shape and a (well polished) vacuum exit window will suffice. For those topography techniques requiring a monochromatic x-ray beam, an additional crystal monochromator is mandatory. A typical configuration at synchrotron sources is a combination of two Silicon crystals, both with surfaces oriented parallel to [111]-lattice planes, in geometrically opposite orientation. This guarantees relatively high intensity, good wavelength selectivity (about 1 part in 10000) and the possibility to change the target wavelength without having to change the beam position ("fixed exit").

=== Sample stage ===
To place the sample under investigation into the x-ray beam, a sample holder is required. While in white-beam techniques a simple fixed holder is sometimes sufficient, experiments with monochromatic techniques typically require one or more degrees of freedom of rotational motion. Samples are therefore placed on a diffractometer, allowing to orient the sample along one, two or three axes. If the sample needs to be displaced, e.g. in order to scan its surface through the beam in several steps, additional translational degrees of freedom are required.

=== Detector ===
After being scattered by the sample, the profile of the diffracted beam needs to be detected by a two-dimensionally resolving X-ray detector. The classical "detector" is X-ray sensitive film, with nuclear plates as a traditional alternative. The first step beyond these "offline" detectors were the so-called image plates, although limited in readout speed and spatial resolution. Since about the mid-1990s, CCD cameras have emerged as a practical alternative, offering many advantages such as fast online readout and the possibility to record entire image series in place. X-ray sensitive CCD cameras, especially those with spatial resolution in the micrometer range, are now well established as electronic detectors for topography. A promising further option for the future may be pixel detectors, although their limited spatial resolution may restrict their usefulness for topography.

General criteria for judging the practical usefulness of detectors for topography applications include spatial resolution, sensitivity, dynamic range ("color depth", in black-white mode), readout speed, weight (important for mounting on diffractometer arms), and price.

=== Systematic overview of techniques and imaging conditions ===
The manifold topographic techniques can be categorized according to several criteria. One of them is the distinction between restricted-beam techniques on the one hand (such as section topography or pinhole topography) and extended-beam techniques on the other hand, which use the full width and intensity of the incoming beam. Another, independent distinction is between integrated-wave topography, making use of the full spectrum of incoming X-ray wavelengths and divergences, and plane-wave (monochromatic) topopgraphy, more selective in both wavelengths and divergence. Integrated-wave topography can be realized as either single-crystal or double-crystal topography. Further distinctions include the one between topography in reflection geometry (Bragg-case) and in transmission geometry (Laue case).

For a full discussion and a graphical hierarchy of topographic techniques, see .

== Experimental techniques I – Some classical topographic techniques ==
The following is an exemplary list of some of the most important experimental techniques for topography:

=== White-beam ===
White-beam topography uses the full bandwidth of X-ray wavelengths in the incoming beam, without any wavelength filtering (no monochromator). The technique is particularly useful in combination with synchrotron radiation sources, due to their wide and continuous wavelength spectrum. In contrast to the monochromatic case, in which accurate sample adjustment is often necessary in order to reach diffraction conditions, the Bragg equation is always and automatically fulfilled in the case of a white X-ray beam: Whatever the angle at which the beam hits a specific lattice plane, there is always one wavelength in the incident spectrum for which the Bragg angle is fulfilled just at this precise angle (on condition that the spectrum is wide enough). White-beam topography is therefore a very simple and fast technique. Disadvantages include the high X-ray dose, possibly leading to radiation damage to the sample, and the necessity to carefully shield the experiment.

White-beam topography produces a pattern of several diffraction spots, each spot being related to one specific lattice plane in the crystal. This pattern, typically recorded on X-ray film, corresponds to a Laue pattern and shows the symmetry of the crystal lattice. The fine structure of each single spot (topograph) is related to defects and distortions in the sample. The distance between spots, and the details of contrast within one single spot, depend on the distance between sample and film; this distance is therefore an important degree of freedom for white-beam topography experiments.

Deformation of the crystal will cause variation in the size of the diffraction spot. For a cylindrically bent crystal the Bragg planes in the crystal lattice will lie on Archimedean spirals (with the exception of those orientated tangentially and radially to the curvature of the bend, which are respectively cylindrical and planar), and the degree of curvature can be determined in a predictable way from the length of the spots and the geometry of the set-up.

White-beam topographs are useful for fast and comprehensive visualization of crystal defect and distortions. They are, however, rather difficult to analyze in any quantitative way, and even a qualitative interpretation often requires considerable experience and time.

=== Plane-wave topography ===
Plane-wave topography is in some sense the opposite of white-beam topography, making use of monochromatic (single-wavelength) and parallel incident beam. In order to achieve diffraction conditions, the sample under study must be precisely aligned. The contrast observed strongly depends on the exact position of the angular working point on the rocking curve of the sample, i.e. on the angular distance between the actual sample rotation position and the theoretical position of the Bragg peak. A sample rotation stage is therefore an essential instrumental precondition for controlling and varying the contrast conditions.

=== Section topography ===
Enlarged synchrotron X-ray transmission section topograph of gallium nitride (11.0 diffraction) on top of sapphire (0-1.0 diffraction). X-ray section beam width was 15 micrometers. Diffraction vector g projection is shown.

While the above techniques use a spatially extended, wide incident beam, section topography is based on a narrow beam on the order of some 10 micrometers (in one or, in the case of pinhole topography with a pencil beam, in both lateral dimensions). Section topographs therefore investigate only a restricted volume of the sample. On its path through the crystal, the beam is diffracted at different depths, each one contributing to image formation on a different location on the detector (film). Section topography can therefore be used for depth-resolved defect analysis.

In section topography, even perfect crystals display fringes. The technique is very sensitive to crystalline defects and strain, as these distort the fringe pattern in the topograph. Quantitative analysis can be performed with the help of image simulation by computer algorithms, usually based on the Takagi-Taupin equations.

An enlarged synchrotron X-ray transmission section topograph on the right shows a diffraction image of the section of a sample having a gallium nitride (GaN) layer grown by metal-organic vapour phase epitaxy on sapphire wafer. Both the epitaxial GaN layer and the sapphire substrate show numerous defects. The GaN layer actually consists of about 20 micrometers wide small-angle grains connected to each other. Strain in the epitaxial layer and substrate is visible as elongated streaks parallel to the diffraction vector direction. The defects on the underside of the sapphire wafer section image are surface defects on the unpolished backside of the sapphire wafer. Between the sapphire and GaN the defects are interfacial defects.

=== Projection topography ===
The setup for projection topography (also called "traverse" topography") is essentially identical to section topography, the difference being that both sample and film are now scanned laterally (synchronously) with respect to the narrow incident beam. A projection topograph therefore corresponds to the superposition of many adjacent section topographs, able to investigate not just a restricted portion, but the entire volume of a crystal.

The technique is rather simple and has been in routine use at "Lang cameras" in many research laboratories.

=== Berg-Barrett ===
Berg-Barrett topography uses a narrow incident beam that is reflected from the surface of the sample under study under conditions of high asymmetry (grazing incidence, steep exit). To achieve sufficient spatial resolution, the detector (film) needs to be placed rather close to the sample surface. Berg-Barrett topography is another routine technique in many X-ray laboratories.

== Experimental techniques II – Advanced topographic techniques ==
=== Topography at synchrotron sources ===
The advent of synchrotron X-ray sources has been beneficial to X-ray topography techniques. Several of the properties of synchrotron radiation are advantageous also for topography applications: The high collimation (more precisely the small angular source size) allows to reach higher geometrical resolution in topographs, even at larger sample-to-detector distances. The continuous wavelength spectrum facilitates white-beam topography. The high beam intensities available at synchrotrons make it possible to investigate small sample volumes, to work at weaker reflections or further off Bragg-conditions (weak beam conditions), and to achieve shorter exposure times. Finally, the discrete time structure of synchrotron radiation permits topographists to use stroboscopic methods to efficiently visualize time-dependent, periodically recurrent structures (such as acoustic waves on crystal surfaces).

=== Neutron topography ===
Diffraction topography with neutron radiation has been in use for several decades, mainly at research reactors with high neutron beam intensities. Neutron topography can make use of contrast mechanisms that are partially different from the X-ray case, and thus serve e.g. to visualize magnetic structures. However, due to the comparatively low neutron intensities, neutron topography requires long exposure times. Its use is therefore rather limited in practice.

Literature:

- Schlenker, M.; Baruchel, J.; Perrier de la Bâthie, R.; Wilson, S. A. (1975). "Neutron-diffraction section topography: Observing crystal slices before cutting them". Journal of Applied Physics. 46 (7). AIP Publishing: 2845–2848. Bibcode:1975JAP....46.2845S. doi:10.1063/1.322029. ISSN 0021-8979.
- Dudley, M.; Baruchel, J.; Sherwood, J. N. (1990-06-01). "Neutron topography as a tool for studying reactive organic crystals: a feasibility study". Journal of Applied Crystallography. 23 (3). International Union of Crystallography (IUCr): 186–198. Bibcode:1990JApCr..23..186D. doi:10.1107/s0021889890000371. ISSN 0021-8898.

=== Topography applied to organic crystals ===
Topography is "classically" applied to inorganic crystals, such a metals and semiconductors. However, it is nowadays applied more and more often also to organic crystals, most notably proteins. Topographic investigations can help to understand and optimize crystal growth processes also for proteins. Numerous studies have been initiated in the last 5–10 years, using both white-beam and plane-wave topography.

Although considerable progress has been achieved, topography on protein crystals remains a difficult discipline: Due to large unit cells, small structure factors and high disorder, diffracted intensities are weak. Topographic imaging therefore requires long exposure times, which may lead to radiation damage of the crystals, generating in the first place the defects which are then imaged. In addition, the low structure factors lead to small Darwin widths and thus to broad dislocation images, i.e. rather low spatial resolution. Nevertheless, in some cases, protein crystals were reported to be perfect enough to achieve images of single dislocations.

Literature:

- Stojanoff, V.; Siddons, D. P. (1996-05-01). "X-ray topography of a lysozyme crystal". Acta Crystallographica Section A. 52 (3). International Union of Crystallography (IUCr): 498–499. Bibcode:1996AcCrA..52..498S. doi:10.1107/s0108767395014553. ISSN 0108-7673.
- Izumi, Kunihide; Sawamura, Sinzo; Ataka, Mitsuo (1996). "X-ray topography of lysozyme crystals". Journal of Crystal Growth. 168 (1–4). Elsevier BV: 106–111. Bibcode:1996JCrGr.168..106I. doi:10.1016/0022-0248(96)00367-3. ISSN 0022-0248.
- Stojanoff, V.; Siddons, D. P.; Monaco, L. A.; Vekilov, P.; Rosenberger, F. (1997-09-01). "X-ray Topography of Tetragonal Lysozyme Grown by the Temperature-Controlled Technique". Acta Crystallographica Section D. 53 (5). International Union of Crystallography (IUCr): 588–595. Bibcode:1997AcCrD..53..588S. doi:10.1107/s0907444997005763. ISSN 0907-4449. PMID 15299890.
- Izumi, Kunihide; Taguchi, Ken; Kobayashi, Yoko; Tachibana, Masaru; Kojima, Kenichi; Ataka, Mitsuo (1999). "Screw dislocation lines in lysozyme crystals observed by Laue topography using synchrotron radiation". Journal of Crystal Growth. 206 (1–2). Elsevier BV: 155–158. Bibcode:1999JCrGr.206..155I. doi:10.1016/s0022-0248(99)00344-9. ISSN 0022-0248.
- Lorber, B.; Sauter, C.; Ng, J.D.; Zhu, D.W.; Giegé, R.; Vidal, O.; Robert, M.C.; Capelle, B. (1999). "Characterization of protein and virus crystals by quasi-planar wave X-ray topography: a comparison between crystals grown in solution and in agarose gel". Journal of Crystal Growth. 204 (3). Elsevier BV: 357–368. Bibcode:1999JCrGr.204..357L. doi:10.1016/s0022-0248(99)00184-0. ISSN 0022-0248.
- Capelle, B.; Epelboin, Y.; Härtwig, J.; Moraleda, A. B.; Otálora, F.; Stojanoff, V. (2004-01-17). "Characterization of dislocations in protein crystals by means of synchrotron double-crystal topography". Journal of Applied Crystallography. 37 (1). International Union of Crystallography (IUCr): 67–71. doi:10.1107/s0021889803024415. hdl:10261/18789. ISSN 0021-8898.
- Lübbert, Daniel; Meents, Alke; Weckert, Edgar (2004-05-21). "Accurate rocking-curve measurements on protein crystals grown in a homogeneous magnetic field of 2.4 T". Acta Crystallographica Section D. 60 (6). International Union of Crystallography (IUCr): 987–998. doi:10.1107/s0907444904005268. ISSN 0907-4449. PMID 15159557.
- Lovelace, Jeffrey J.; Murphy, Cameron R.; Bellamy, Henry D.; Brister, Keith; Pahl, Reinhard; Borgstahl, Gloria E. O. (2005-05-13). "Advances in digital topography for characterizing imperfections in protein crystals". Journal of Applied Crystallography. 38 (3). International Union of Crystallography (IUCr): 512–519. doi:10.1107/s0021889805009234. ISSN 0021-8898.

=== Topography on thin layered structures ===
Not only volume crystals can be imaged by topography, but also crystalline layers on a foreign substrate. For very thin layers, the scattering volume and thus the diffracted intensities are very low. In these cases, topographic imaging is therefore a rather demanding task, unless incident beams with very high intensities are available.

== Experimental techniques III – Special techniques and recent developments ==
=== Reticulography ===
A relatively new topography-related technique (first published in 1996) is the so-called reticulography. Based on white-beam topography, the new aspect consists in placing a fine-scaled metallic grid ("reticule") between sample and detector. The metallic grid lines are highly absorbing, producing dark lines in the recorded image. While for flat, homgeneous sample the image of the grid is rectilinear, just as the grid itself, strongly deformed grid images may occur in the case of tilted or strained sample. The deformation results from Bragg angle changes (and thus different directions of propagation of the diffracted beams) due to lattice parameter differences (or tilted crystallites) in the sample. The grid serves to split the diffracted beam into an array of microbeams, and to backtrace the propagation of each individual microbeam onto the sample surface. By recording reticulographic images at several sample-to-detector distances, and appropriate data processing, local distributions of misorientation across the sample surface can be derived.

- Lang, A. R.; Makepeace, A. P. W. (1996-11-01). "Reticulography: a simple and sensitive technique for mapping misorientations in single crystals". Journal of Synchrotron Radiation. 3 (6). International Union of Crystallography (IUCr): 313–315. Bibcode:1996JSynR...3..313L. doi:10.1107/s0909049596010515. ISSN 0909-0495. PMID 16702698.
- Lang, A. R.; Makepeace, A. P. W. (1999-12-01). "Synchrotron X-ray reticulographic measurement of lattice deformations associated with energetic ion implantation in diamond". Journal of Applied Crystallography. 32 (6). International Union of Crystallography (IUCr): 1119–1126. Bibcode:1999JApCr..32.1119L. doi:10.1107/s0021889899010924. ISSN 0021-8898.

=== Digital topography ===
The use of electronic detectors such as X-ray CCD cameras, replacing traditional X-ray film, facilitates topography in many ways. CCDs achieve online readout in (almost) real-time, dispensing experimentalists of the need to develop films in a dark room. Drawbacks with respect to films are the limited dynamic range and, above all, the moderate spatial resolution of commercial CCD cameras, making the development of dedicated CCD cameras necessary for high-resolution imaging. A further, decisive advantage of digital topography is the possibility to record series of images without changing detector position, thanks to online readout. This makes it possible, without complicated image registration procedures, to observe time-dependent phenomena, to perform kinetic studies, to investigate processes of device degradation and radiation damage, and to realize sequential topography (see below).

=== Time-resolved (stroboscopic) topography; Imaging of surface acoustic waves ===
To image time-dependent, periodically fluctuating phenomena, topography can be combined with stroboscopic exposure techniques. In this way, one selected phase of a sinusoidally varying movement is selectively images as a "snapshot". First applications were in the field of surface acoustic waves on semiconductor surfaces.

Literature:

- Zolotoyabko, E.; Shilo, D.; Sauer, W.; Pernot, E.; Baruchel, J. (1998-10-19). "Visualization of 10 μm surface acoustic waves by stroboscopic x-ray topography". Applied Physics Letters. 73 (16). AIP Publishing: 2278–2280. Bibcode:1998ApPhL..73.2278Z. doi:10.1063/1.121701. ISSN 0003-6951.
- Sauer, W.; Streibl, M.; Metzger, T. H.; Haubrich, A. G. C.; Manus, S.; Wixforth, A.; Peisl, J.; Mazuelas, A.; Härtwig, J.; Baruchel, J. (1999-09-20). "X-ray imaging and diffraction from surface phonons on GaAs". Applied Physics Letters. 75 (12). AIP Publishing: 1709–1711. Bibcode:1999ApPhL..75.1709S. doi:10.1063/1.124797. ISSN 0003-6951.

=== Topo-tomography; 3D dislocation distributions ===
By combining topographic image formation with tomographic image reconstruction, distributions of defects can be resolved in three dimensions. Unlike "classical" computed tomography (CT), image contrast is not based on differences in absorption (absorption contrast), but on the usual contrast mechanisms of topography (diffraction contrast). In this way, three-dimensional distributions of dislocations in crystals have been imaged.

Literature:

- Ludwig, W.; Cloetens, P.; Härtwig, J.; Baruchel, J.; Hamelin, B.; Bastie, P. (2001-09-25). "Three-dimensional imaging of crystal defects by 'topo-tomography'". Journal of Applied Crystallography. 34 (5). International Union of Crystallography (IUCr): 602–607. doi:10.1107/s002188980101086x. ISSN 0021-8898.

=== Sequential topography / Rocking Curve Imaging ===
Plane-wave topography can be made to extract an additional wealth of information from a sample by recording not just one image, but an entire sequence of topographs all along the sample's rocking curve. By following the diffracted intensity in one pixel across the entire sequence of images, local rocking curves from very small areas of sample surface can be reconstructed. Although the required post-processing and numerical analysis is sometimes moderately demanding, the effort is often compensated by very comprehensive information on the sample's local properties. Quantities that become quantitatively measurable in this way include local scattering power, local lattice tilts (crystallite misorientation), and local lattice quality and perfection. Spatial resolution is, in many cases, essentially given by the detector pixel size.

The technique of sequential topography, in combination with appropriate data analysis methods also called rocking curve imaging, constitutes a method of microdiffraction imaging, i.e. a combination of X-ray imaging with X-ray diffractometry.

Literature:

- Lübbert, D; Baumbach, T; Härtwig, J; Boller, E; Pernot, E (2000). "μm-resolved high resolution X-ray diffraction imaging for semiconductor quality control". Nuclear Instruments and Methods in Physics Research Section B: Beam Interactions with Materials and Atoms. 160 (4). Elsevier BV: 521–527. Bibcode:2000NIMPB.160..521L. doi:10.1016/s0168-583x(99)00619-9. ISSN 0168-583X.
- Hoszowska, J; Freund, A K; Boller, E; Sellschop, J P F; Level, G; Härtwig, J; Burns, R C; Rebak, M; Baruchel, J (2001-05-03). "Characterization of synthetic diamond crystals by spatially resolved rocking curve measurements". Journal of Physics D: Applied Physics. 34 (10A). IOP Publishing: A47–A51. Bibcode:2001JPhD...34A..47H. doi:10.1088/0022-3727/34/10a/311. ISSN 0022-3727.
- Mikul k, P; L bbert, D; Koryt r, D; Pernot, P; Baumbach, T (2003-04-22). "Synchrotron area diffractometry as a tool for spatial high-resolution three-dimensional lattice misorientation mapping". Journal of Physics D: Applied Physics. 36 (10A). IOP Publishing: A74–A78. Bibcode:2003JPhD...36A..74M. doi:10.1088/0022-3727/36/10a/315. ISSN 0022-3727.
- Lovelace, Jeffrey J.; Murphy, Cameron R.; Pahl, Reinhard; Brister, Keith; Borgstahl, Gloria E. O. (2006-05-10). "Tracking reflections through cryogenic cooling with topography". Journal of Applied Crystallography. 39 (3). International Union of Crystallography (IUCr): 425–432. doi:10.1107/s0021889806012763. ISSN 0021-8898.

=== MAXIM ===
The "MAXIM" (MAterials X-ray IMaging) method is another method combining diffraction analysis with spatial resolution. It can be viewed as serial topography with additional angular resolution in the exit beam. In contrast to the Rocking Curve Imaging method, it is more appropriate for more highly disturbed (polycrystalline) materials with lower crystalline perfection. The difference on the instrumental side is that MAXIM uses an array of slits / small channels (a so-called "multi-channel plate" (MCP), the two-dimensional equivalent of a Soller slit system) as an additional X-ray optical element between sample and CCD detector. These channels transmit intensity only in specific, parallel directions, and thus guarantee a one-to-one-relation between detector pixels and points on the sample surface, which would otherwise not be given in the case of materials with high strain and/or a strong mosaicity. The spatial resolution of the method is limited by a combination of detector pixel size and channel plate periodicity, which in the ideal case are identical. The angular resolution is mostly given by the aspect ratio (length over width) of the MCP channels.

Literature:

- Wroblewski, T.; Geier, S.; Hessmer, R.; Schreck, M.; Rauschenbach, B. (1995). "X-ray imaging of polycrystalline materialsa)". Review of Scientific Instruments. 66 (6). AIP Publishing: 3560–3562. Bibcode:1995RScI...66.3560W. doi:10.1063/1.1145469. ISSN 0034-6748.
- Wroblewski, T.; Clauß, O.; Crostack, H.-A.; Ertel, A.; Fandrich, F.; Genzel, Ch.; Hradil, K.; Ternes, W.; Woldt, E. (1999). "A new diffractometer for materials science and imaging at HASYLAB beamline G3". Nuclear Instruments and Methods in Physics Research Section A: Accelerators, Spectrometers, Detectors and Associated Equipment. 428 (2–3). Elsevier BV: 570–582. Bibcode:1999NIMPA.428..570W. doi:10.1016/s0168-9002(99)00144-8. ISSN 0168-9002.
- Pyzalla, A.; Wang, L.; Wild, E.; Wroblewski, T. (2001). "Changes in microstructure, texture and residual stresses on the surface of a rail resulting from friction and wear". Wear. 251 (1–12). Elsevier BV: 901–907. doi:10.1016/s0043-1648(01)00748-7. ISSN 0043-1648.

== Literature ==
- Books (chronological order):
  - Tanner, Brian: X-ray diffraction topography. Pergamon Press (1976).ISBN 0080196926.
  - Authier, André and Lagomarsino, Stefano and Tanner, Brian K. (editors): X-Ray and Neutron Dynamical Diffraction – Theory and Applications. Plenum Press / Kluwer Academic Publishers (1996). ISBN 0-306-45501-3.
  - Bowen, Keith and Tanner, Brian: High Resolution X-Ray Diffractometry and Topography. Taylor and Francis (1998). ISBN 0-85066-758-5.
  - Authier, André (2003). Dynamical theory of X-ray diffraction. IUCr monographs on crystallography. Vol. 11 (2 ed.). Oxford University Press. ISBN 0-19-852892-2.
- Reviews
  - Lang, A. R.: Techniques and interpretation in X-ray topography. In: Diffraction and Imaging Techniques in Materials Science (edited by Amelinckx S., Gevers R. and Van Landuyt J.) 2nd ed. rev. (1978), pp 623–714. Amsterdam: North Holland.
  - Klapper, Helmut: X-ray topography of organic crystals. In: Crystals: Growth, Properties and Applications, vol. 13 (1991), pp 109–162. Berlin-Heidelberg: Springer.
  - Lang, A. R.: Topography. In: International Tables for Crystallography, Vol. C (1992), Section 2.7, p. 113. Kluwer, Dordrecht.
  - Tuomi, T: Synchrotron X-ray topography of electronic materials. Journal of Synchrotron Radiation (2002) 9, 174-178.
  - Baruchel, J. and Härtwig, J. and Pernot-Rejmánková, P.: Present state and perspectives of synchrotron radiation diffraction imaging. Journal of Synchrotron Radiation (2002) 9, 107-114.
- Selected original articles (chronological order):
  - X-ray topography
    - Barrett, Charles S. (1931-08-15). "Laue Spots From Perfect, Imperfect, and Oscillating Crystals". Physical Review. 38 (4). American Physical Society (APS): 832–833. Bibcode:1931PhRv...38..832B. doi:10.1103/physrev.38.832. ISSN 0031-899X.
    - Berg, Wolfgang (1931). "Über eine röntgenographische Methode zur Untersuchung von Gitterstörungen an Kristallen". Die Naturwissenschaften (in German). 19 (19). Springer Science and Business Media LLC: 391–396. Bibcode:1931NW.....19..391B. doi:10.1007/bf01522358. ISSN 0028-1042. S2CID 36422396.
    - Borrmann, G. (1941). "Über Extinktionsdiagramme der Röntgenstrahlen von Quarz". Physikalische Zeitschrift. 42: 157-162.
    - Guinier, A.; Tennevin, J. (1949-06-02). "Sur deux variantes de la méthode de Laue et leurs applications". Acta Crystallographica. 2 (3). International Union of Crystallography (IUCr): 133–138. Bibcode:1949AcCry...2..133G. doi:10.1107/s0365110x49000370. ISSN 0365-110X.
    - Bond, W.L.; Andrus, J. (1952). "Structural imperfections in quartz crystals". American Mineralogist. 37: 622–632.
    - Lang, A.R (1957). "A method for the examination of crystal sections using penetrating characteristic X radiation". Acta Metallurgica. 5 (7). Elsevier BV: 358–364. doi:10.1016/0001-6160(57)90002-0. ISSN 0001-6160.
    - Lang, A. R. (1957-12-01). "Abstracts of Papers: Point-by.point X-ray diffraction studies of imperfections in melt-grown crystals". Acta Crystallographica. 10 (12). International Union of Crystallography (IUCr): 839. doi:10.1107/s0365110x57002649. ISSN 0365-110X.
    - Lang, A. R. (1958). "Direct Observation of Individual Dislocations by X-Ray Diffraction". Journal of Applied Physics. 29 (3). AIP Publishing: 597–598. Bibcode:1958JAP....29..597L. doi:10.1063/1.1723234. ISSN 0021-8979.
    - Lang, A. R. (1959-03-10). "The projection topograph: a new method in X-ray diffraction microradiography". Acta Crystallographica. 12 (3). International Union of Crystallography (IUCr): 249–250. Bibcode:1959AcCry..12..249L. doi:10.1107/s0365110x59000706. ISSN 0365-110X.
    - T. Tuomi, K. Naukkarinen, E. Laurila, P. Rabe: Rapid high resolution X-ray topography with synchrotron radiation. Acta Polytechnica Scandinavica, Ph. Incl. Nucleonics Series No. 100, (1973), 1-8.
    - Tuomi, T.; Naukkarinen, K.; Rabe, P. (1974-09-16). "Use of synchrotron radiation in X-ray diffraction topography". Physica Status Solidi A. 25 (1). Wiley: 93–106. Bibcode:1974PSSAR..25...93T. doi:10.1002/pssa.2210250106. ISSN 0031-8965.
    - Klapper, H. (1975-04-01). "The influence of elastic anisotropy on the X-ray topographic image width of pure screw dislocations". Journal of Applied Crystallography. 8 (2). International Union of Crystallography (IUCr): 204. Bibcode:1975JApCr...8..204K. doi:10.1107/s0021889875010163. ISSN 0021-8898.
    - Hart, M. (1975-08-01). "Synchrotron radiation – its application to high-speed, high-resolution X-ray diffraction topography". Journal of Applied Crystallography. 8 (4). International Union of Crystallography (IUCr): 436–444. Bibcode:1975JApCr...8..436H. doi:10.1107/s002188987501093x. ISSN 0021-8898.
    - Klapper, H. (1976-08-01). "The influence of elastic anisotropy on the X-ray topographic image width of pure screw dislocations". Journal of Applied Crystallography. 9 (4). International Union of Crystallography (IUCr): 310–317. Bibcode:1976JApCr...9..310K. doi:10.1107/s0021889876011400. ISSN 0021-8898.
    - Tanner, B. K.; Midgley, D.; Safa, M. (1977-08-01). "Dislocation contrast in X-ray synchrotron topographs". Journal of Applied Crystallography. 10 (4). International Union of Crystallography (IUCr): 281–286. Bibcode:1977JApCr..10..281T. doi:10.1107/s0021889877013491. ISSN 0021-8898.
    - Fisher, G. R.; Barnes, P.; Kelly, J. F. (1993-10-01). "Dislocation contrast in white-radiation synchrotron topography of silicon carbide". Journal of Applied Crystallography. 26 (5). International Union of Crystallography (IUCr): 677–682. Bibcode:1993JApCr..26..677F. doi:10.1107/s0021889893004017. ISSN 0021-8898.
    - Lang, A R (1993-04-14). "The early days of high-resolution X-ray topography". Journal of Physics D: Applied Physics. 26 (4A). IOP Publishing: A1–A8. Bibcode:1993JPhD...26....1L. doi:10.1088/0022-3727/26/4a/001. ISSN 0022-3727.
    - Zontone, F.; Mancini, L.; Barrett, R.; Baruchel, J.; Härtwig, J.; Epelboin, Y. (1996-07-01). "New Features of Dislocation Images in Third-Generation Synchrotron Radiation Topographs". Journal of Synchrotron Radiation. 3 (4). International Union of Crystallography (IUCr): 173–184. Bibcode:1996JSynR...3..173Z. doi:10.1107/s0909049596002269. ISSN 0909-0495. PMID 16702676.
    - Baruchel, José; Cloetens, Peter; Härtwig, Jürgen; Ludwig, Wolfgang; Mancini, Lucia; Pernot, Petra; Schlenker, Michel (2000-05-01). "Phase imaging using highly coherent X-rays: radiography, tomography, diffraction topography". Journal of Synchrotron Radiation. 7 (3). International Union of Crystallography (IUCr): 196–201. doi:10.1107/s0909049500002995. ISSN 0909-0495. PMID 16609195.
  - Special applications:
    - Kelly, J.F.; Barnes, P.; Fisher, G.R. (1995). "The use of synchrotron edge topography to study polytype nearest neighbour relationships in SiC" (PDF). Radiation Physics and Chemistry. 45 (3). Elsevier BV: 509–522. Bibcode:1995RaPC...45..509K. doi:10.1016/0969-806x(94)00101-o. ISSN 0969-806X.
    - Wieteska, K.; Wierzchowski, W.; Graeff, W.; Turos, A.; Grötzschel, R. (2000-09-01). "Characterization of implanted semiconductors by means of white-beam and plane-wave synchrotron topography". Journal of Synchrotron Radiation. 7 (5). International Union of Crystallography (IUCr): 318–325. doi:10.1107/s0909049500009420. ISSN 0909-0495. PMID 16609215.
    - Altin, D.; Härtwig, J.; Köhler, R.; Ludwig, W.; Ohler, M.; Klein, H. (2002-08-31). "X-ray diffraction topography using a diffractometer with a bendable monochromator at a synchrotron radiation source". Journal of Synchrotron Radiation. 9 (5). International Union of Crystallography (IUCr): 282–286. doi:10.1107/s0909049502010294. ISSN 0909-0495. PMID 12200570.
  - Instrumentation and beamlines for topography:
    - Espeso, José I.; Cloetens, Peter; Baruchel, José; Härtwig, Jürgen; Mairs, Trevor; Biasci, Jean Claude; Marot, Gérard; Salomé-Pateyron, Murielle; Schlenker, Michel (1998-09-01). "Conserving the Coherence and Uniformity of Third-Generation Synchrotron Radiation Beams: the Case of ID19, a 'Long' Beamline at the ESRF". Journal of Synchrotron Radiation. 5 (5). International Union of Crystallography (IUCr): 1243–1249. Bibcode:1998JSynR...5.1243E. doi:10.1107/s0909049598002271. ISSN 0909-0495. PMID 16687829.

== See also ==
- Crystallography
- Dynamical theory of x-ray diffraction
- High energy X-rays
- X-ray diffraction
- X-ray imaging
- X-ray optics
