= Alexander Wells =

Alexander Wells may refer to:

- Alexander Wells (California judge) (1819–1854), California Supreme Court Justice
- Alexander F. Wells (1912–1994), British chemist and crystallographer
- Alexander H. Wells (died 1857), New York attorney and politician
- Alexander Wells (baseball) (born 1997), baseball player

== See also ==
- Alexander Welles, English MP
