= D. W. J. Cruickshank =

British crystallographer

- Born: Durward William John Cruickshank; 7 March 1924; London, UK
- Died: 13 July 2007 (aged 83); Alderley Edge, UK
- Education: Loughborough University; University of London; University of Cambridge; University of Leeds
- Known for: Thermal ellipsoid
- Scientific career
- Fields: Crystallography
- Institutions: University of Leeds; University of Glasgow; University of Manchester
- Doctoral advisor: Ernest Gordon Cox

Durward William John Cruickshank FRS (7 March 1924 – 13 July 2007), often known as D. W. J. Cruickshank, was a British crystallographer whose work transformed the precision of determining molecular structures from X-ray crystal structure analysis. He developed the theoretical framework for anisotropic displacement parameters, also known as the thermal ellipsoid, for crystal structure determination in a series of papers published in 1956 in Acta Crystallographica.

== Early life and education ==
Cruickshank was born in London on 7 March 1924, the son of William Durward Cruickshank and his wife Margaret Ombler Meek, both of whom were doctors. He was educated at St Lawrence College in Ramsgate, Kent. He studied engineering at Loughborough College (which became Loughborough University in 1966), receiving an external degree with first class honours from the University of London in 1944.

From 1944 to 1946 he worked for the Admiralty in the Special Operations Executive (SOE) on naval operational research, including on underwater submersibles.

Cruickshank subsequently studied mathematics at St John's College, Cambridge, graduating with a first-class BA in 1949, an MA in 1954 and finally a ScD in 1961. He received a PhD from the University of Leeds in 1952.

== Academic career ==
Cruickshank joined Gordon (later Sir Gordon) Cox's group at the University of Leeds as a temporary research assistant and where he was appointed Lecturer in Mathematical Chemistry in 1950 and promoted to Reader in 1957. From 1962 to 1967 he was the first Joseph Black Professor of Chemistry at the University of Glasgow.

In 1967 Cruickshank moved to Manchester, becoming Professor of Theoretical Chemistry at University of Manchester Institute of Science and Technology (UMIST) where he remained until his retirement as Emeritus Professor in 1983. He was Deputy Principal there from 1971 to 1972. UMIST became part of the University of Manchester in 2004.

He kept doing research after his retirement, publishing his last paper in 2007, the year he died.

== Honours and awards ==
Cruickshank was elected a Fellow of the Royal Society (FRS) in 1979. In 1991, he received the Dorothy Hodgkin Prize of the British Crystallographic Association, where he served as Vice President from 1983 to 1985.

Elected to membership of the Manchester Literary and Philosophical Society in 1971

Cruickshank was awarded the honorary degree of DSc by the University of Glasgow in 2004.

== Death ==
Cruickshank died from cancer in Alderley Edge, Cheshire on 13 July 2007 at the age of 83. His wife, Marjorie, predeceased him. He was survived by a son and a daughter.

== Archives ==
Cruickshank's papers are held by the University of Manchester Library.

== See also ==
- Timeline of crystallography
