= Hermanus Haga =

Dutch physicist (1852–1936)

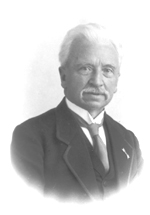
Herman Haga

Herman Haga (Oldeboorn, 24 January 1852 – Zeist, 11 September 1936) was a Dutch physicist.

== Career ==
Haga studied physics from 1871 to 1876 at the University of Leiden. He received his PhD with thesis Over de absorptie van stralende warmte door waterdamp (On the absorption of radiant heat by water vapor) under the direction of Pieter L. Rijke. From 1886 to 1921 Haga was professor of physics at the University of Groningen, where he designed and oversaw the building of a new physics laboratory, opened in 1892. From 1900 Haga was also the rector of the University of Groningen. He performed experiments on the voltage of the Weston cell; these experiments lead to the modern definition of the volt. With Cornelis Wind, Haga passed X-rays through a 15-micrometer slit as a source with a V-shaped narrowing slit as a target. The target slit was 27 micrometers at the opening and nearly 0 micrometers at the output. Haga and Wind interpreted a diffuse broadening of the X-rays emitted at the narrower end of the slit as a diffraction pattern.

Haga was one of the founders of the Nederlandse Natuurkundige Vereniging (Dutch Physics Association). In addition to Cornelis Harm Wind (1867–1911), Haga's doctoral students include the crystallographer Pieter Terpstra (1886–1973) and Ekko Oosterhuis (1886–1966), who was the second scientist to join the Philips Natuurkundig Laboratorium.

In 1896 Haga became a member of the Royal Netherlands Academy of Arts and Sciences.
