= Bilbao Crystallographic Server =

Open access website

Bilbao Crystallography Server

- Bilbao Crystallographic Server main page
- Website type: Scientific Tools (Crystallography & Solid State Physics)
- Available in: English
- Owner: University of the Basque Country
- Creators: Mois I. Aroyo, J. Manuel Perez-Mato, Gotzon Madariaga
- Website: cryst.ehu.es
- Launched: 1997
- Current status: Online

Bilbao Crystallographic Server is an open access website offering online crystallographic database and programs aimed at analyzing, calculating and visualizing problems of structural and mathematical crystallography, solid state physics and structural chemistry. Initiated in 1997 by the Materials Laboratory of the Department of Condensed Matter Physics at the University of the Basque Country, Bilbao, Spain, the Bilbao Crystallographic Server is developed and maintained by academics.

== Information on contents and an overview of tools hosted ==
Focusing on crystallographic data and applications of the group theory in solid state physics, the server is built on a core of databases and contains different shells.

=== Space Groups Retrieval Tools ===
The set of databases includes data from International Tables of Crystallography, Vol. A: Space-Group Symmetry, and the data of maximal subgroups of space groups as listed in International Tables of Crystallography, Vol. A1: Symmetry relations between space groups. A k-vector database with Brillouin zone figures and classification tables of the k-vectors for space groups is also available via the KVEC tool.

=== Magnetic Space Groups ===
In 2011, the Magnetic Space Groups data compiled from H.T. Stokes & B.J. Campbell's and D. Litvin's's works general positions/symmetry operations and Wyckoff positions for different settings, along with systematic absence rules have also been incorporated into the server and a new shell has been dedicated to the related tools (MGENPOS, MWYCKPOS, MAGNEXT).

=== Group-Subgroup Relations of Space Groups ===
This shell contains applications which are essential for problems involving group-subgroup relations between space groups. Given the space group types of G and H and their index, the program SUBGROUPGRAPH provides graphs of maximal subgroups for a group-subgroup pair G > H, all the different subgroups H and their distribution into conjugacy classes. The Wyckoff position splitting rules for a group-subgroup pair are calculated by the program WYCKSPLIT.

=== Representation Theory Applications ===
The fourth shell includes programs on representation theory of space and point groups. REPRES constructs little group and full group irreducible representations for a given space group and a k-vector; CORREL deals with the correlations between the irreducible representations of group-subgroup related space groups. The program POINT lists character tables of crystallographic point groups, Kronecker multiplication tables of their irreducible representations and further useful symmetry information.

=== Solid State Theory Applications ===
This shell is related to solid state physics and structural chemistry. The program PSEUDO performs an evaluation of the pseudosymmetry of a given structure with respect to supergroups of its space group. AMPLIMODES performs the symmetry-mode analysis of any distorted structure of displacive type. The analysis consists in decomposing the symmetry-breaking distortion present in the distorted structure into contributions from different symmetry-adapted modes. Given the high and low symmetry structures, the program calculates the amplitudes and polarization vectors of the distortion modes of different symmetry frozen in the structure. The program SAM calculates symmetry-adapted modes for the centre of the Brillouin zone and classifies them according to their infrared and Raman activity. NEUTRON computes the phonon extinction rules in inelastic neutron scattering. Its results are also relevant for diffuse-scattering experiments.

=== Structure Utilities ===
A set of structure utilities has been included for various applications such as: the transformation of unit cells (CELLTRAN) or complete structures (TRANSTRU); strain tensor calculation (STRAIN); assignment of Wyckoff Positions (WPASSIGN); equivalent descriptions of a given structure (EQUIVSTRU); comparison of different structures with support for the affine normalizers of monoclinic space groups. STRUCTURE RELATIONS calculates the possible transformation matrices for a given pair of group-subgroup related structures.

=== Incommensurate Crystal Structures Database ===
The Bilbao Crystallographic Server also hosts the B-IncStrDB: Bilbao Incommensurate Crystal Structures Database, a database for incommensurately modulated and composite structures.

== Scientific Research ==
In addition to receiving citations from scientific articles and theses, the Bilbao Crystallographic Server also actively publishes research reports in internationally reviewed articles, as well as hosting/participating in international workshops, summer schools and conferences. A list of these publications and events are accessible from the server's web page..

== Development History and People ==
The Bilbao Crystallographic Server came to life in 1997 as a scientific project by the Departments of Condensed Matter Physics and Applied Physics II of the University of the Basque Country (EHU) under the supervision of J. Manuel Perez-Mato (EHU) and Mois I. Aroyo (EHU), in coordination with Gotzon Madariaga (EHU) and Hans Wondratschek (Karlsruhe Institute of Technology, Germany) with funding from the Basque government and several ministries of the Spanish government. The initial code was written by then Ph.D. students Eli Kroumova (EHU) and Svet Ivantchev (EHU) and the very first shells related to retrieval tools, group-subgroup relations and space group representations have soon appeared online.

Afterwards, in collaboration with Harold T. Stokes and Dorian M. Hatch from Brigham Young University, USA, the server extended its services to include symmetry modes analysis. Asen K. Kirov, a Ph.D. student from Sofia University, Bulgaria contributed to the server, working on programs dedicated to irreducible representations and extinction rules.

In 2001, Ph.D. student Cesar Capillas began his research on the server and became the main developer and system administrator focusing on structure relations, such as pseudosymmetry and phase transitions. Danel Orobengoa, also a Ph.D. student, joined the developer team in 2005 and worked mainly on symmetry modes, k-vector classification tables and non-characteristic orbits (in collaboration with Massimo Nespolo of the Nancy-Université, France), writing his Ph.D. thesis on the applications of the server for ferroic materials.

In 2009, Ph.D. student Gemma de la Flor and post-doc Emre S. Tasci were recruited for the development team: de la Flor working mainly on the identification and interpretation of symmetry operations, structure comparison and Tasci becoming the new system administrator and main developer, focusing in the structure relations concerning phase transitions. The Bilbao Crystallographic Server team took its current (2012) line-up in 2010 with the addition of Ph.D. student Samuel Vidal Gallego, his main research field being the magnetic space groups.
