= Varley F. Sears =

Canadian physicist (1937–2019)

Varley Fullerton Sears (born 1937, died at age 81 in Deep River, Ontario on June 9, 2019) was a Canadian physicist, notable for his contributions to the methodological foundations of neutron scattering.

In 1960, Sears obtained a Ph.D. from the University of Toronto with a thesis on The rotational absorption spectrum of solid and liquid parahydrogen. From 1963 to 1965, the National Research Council of Canada sent him as an Overseas Postdoctoral Fellow to the Clarendon Laboratory in Oxford where he was hosted by Roger James Elliott and worked on Raman scattering by semiconductors. Back in Canada, he became a staff scientist in the Theoretical Physics Branch of Chalk River Laboratories. In 1966/67, he published seminal papers on neutron spectra of molecular rotors. By the 1980s, he had become a leading expert in neutron optics, publishing a review and a textbook on the subject. Based on these foundations, he compiled authoritative tables of neutron scattering lengths. In 1997, he published a generic solution of the Darwin-Hamilton equations that provide an approximative description of multiple Bragg reflection by a mosaic crystal.

He was elected a Fellow of the American Physical Society in 1990.
