= Caesium dichloroiodate =

Chemical compound

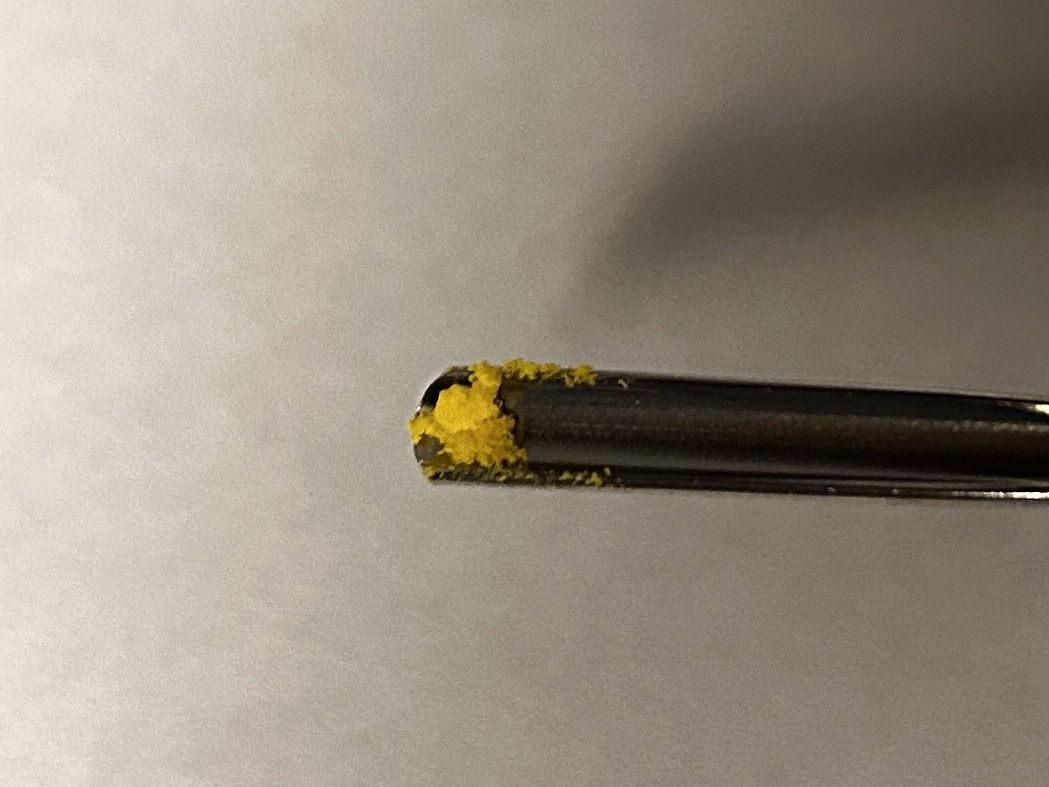
- Caesium dichloroiodate on a lab spatula

Names
- IUPAC name Caesium dichloroiodate(I)
- Other names Cesium dichloroiodide

Identifiers
CAS Number	15605-42-2
3D model (JSmol)	Interactive image
ChemSpider	14375976
EC Number	239-686-3
PubChem CID	23685551
CompTox Dashboard (EPA)	DTXSID101376671
- InChI: InChI=1S/Cl2I.Cs/c1-3-2;/q-1;+1 Key: WYPYOYILFBSLTD-UHFFFAOYSA-N
- SMILES: Cl[I-]Cl.[Cs+]

Properties
Chemical formula	Cl_{2}CsI
Molar mass	330.71 g·mol^{−1}
Appearance	trigonal orange-yellow crystals
Density	3.86 g·cm^{−3} (20 °C); 3.888 g·cm^{−3} (26 °C)
Melting point	139 °C (decomposes)
Solubility in water	carbon tetrachloride: 0.00126 (25°C), water: soluble, ethanol: soluble

Structure
Crystal structure	Trigonal
Space group	R3̅m, No. 166
Lattice constant	a = 5.469(2) Å α = 70.67(3)°, β = 70.67(3)°, γ = 70.67(3)°
Lattice volume (V)	141.079 Å^{3}
Formula units (Z)	1

Hazards
- GHS labelling
Pictograms	(GHS07: Exclamation mark)
Signal word	Warning
Hazard statements	H315, H319, H335
Precautionary statements	P261, P264, P264+P265, P271, P280, P302+P352, P304+P340, P305+P351+P338, P319, P321, P332+P317, P337+P317, P362+P364, P403+P233, P405, P501
- Except where otherwise noted, data are given for materials in their standard state (at 25 °C [77 °F], 100 kPa). Infobox references

Caesium dichloroiodate, also called caesium dichloroiodide is an inorganic compound with the formula CsICl_{2}. This yellow-orange salt is a crystalline solid in its pure form at room temperature. Fractional crystallization of caesium dichloroiodate may be used to separate caesium from rubidium and purify it, as rubidium dichloroiodate (RbICl_{2}) is much more soluble in hydrochloric acid. Furthermore, other metal impurities do not form dichloroiodate salts. Caesium dichloroiodate is notable for containing the linear dichloroiodate anions ICl_{2}^{−}, with connectivity Cl-I-Cl, which is analog of triiodide anion I_{3}^{−}.

== Structure ==
The resolution of the crystal structure of caesium dichloroiodate via X-ray diffraction, by Wyckoff in his 1919 Ph.D. thesis (published 1920), established the linearity of the dichloroiodate ion, one of the first complex ions to have its structure solved using X-ray crystallography. The dichloroiodate ion is symmetric, with an I–Cl bond length of 2.548 Å (254.8 pm).

== Properties ==
Caesium dichloroiodate readily dissolves in room temperature water, forming a dark yellow-purple solution. This color is due to the production of free iodine via the hydrolysis of caesium dichloroiodate to elemental iodine, hydrochloric acid, and caesium ions. Such hydrolysis also slowly occurs on contact with normal air, which contains moisture, however this change is negligible over the time scale of a few days to weeks.

== Preparation ==
Caesium dichloroiodate may be synthesized via the reaction of caesium chloride (acidified using hydrochloric acid (or acetic acid)) with iodine monochloride. Thermolysis (ending at 450–500 °C) recovers the starting materials. Additionally, caesium dichloroiodate may be synthesized in situ via the addition of chlorine gas to an acidic solution containing elemental iodine and caesium chloride.
