= Microcrystal electron diffraction =

Specialized technique for electron diffraction

Microcrystal electron diffraction, or MicroED, is a CryoEM method that was developed by the Gonen laboratory in late 2013 at the Janelia Research Campus of the Howard Hughes Medical Institute. MicroED is a form of electron crystallography where thin 3D crystals are used for structure determination by electron diffraction. Prior to this demonstration, macromolecular (protein) electron crystallography was mainly used on 2D crystals, for example. The method is one of several modern versions of approaches to determine atomic structures using electron diffraction first demonstrated for the positions of hydrogen atoms in NH4Cl crystals by W. E. Laschkarew and I. D. Usykin in 1933, which has since been used for surfaces, via precession electron diffraction, with much of the early work described in the work of Boris Vainshtein and Douglas L. Dorset.

The method was developed for structure determination of proteins from nanocrystals that are typically not suitable for X-ray diffraction because of their size. Crystals that are one billionth the size needed for X-ray crystallography can yield high quality data. The samples are frozen hydrated as for all other CryoEM modalities but instead of using the transmission electron microscope (TEM) in imaging mode one uses it in diffraction mode with a low electron exposure (typically < 0.01 e^{−}/Å^{2}/s). The nano crystal is exposed to the diffracting beam and continuously rotated while diffraction is collected on a fast camera as a movie. MicroED data is then processed using software for X-ray crystallography for structure analysis and refinement. The hardware and software used in a MicroED experiment are standard and broadly available.

== Development ==
Electron diffraction to solve crystal structures date back to the earliest days of electron diffraction. The first successful demonstration of MicroED was reported in 2013 by the Gonen laboratory for the structure of lysozyme, a classic test protein in X-ray crystallography.

== Experimental setup ==
Detailed protocols for setting up the electron microscope and for data collections have been published.

=== Instrumentation ===
==== Microscope ====
MicroED data is collected using transmission electron (cryogenic) microscopy. The microscope can be equipped with a selected area aperture but MicroED can also be done without a selected area aperture. While some structures have been reported without freezing, radiation damage is sometimes minimized and higher resolution obtained by using cryo cooling even for small molecules.

==== Detectors ====
A variety of detectors have been used to collected electron diffraction data in MicroED experiments. Detectors utilizing charge-coupled device (CCD) and complementary metal–oxide–semiconductor (CMOS) technology have been used. With CMOS detectors, individual electron counts can be interpreted. More recently, direct electron detectors have been successfully used in both linear and counting modes. In these examples electron counting allowed ab initio phasing and visualization of hydrogens in proteins.

=== Data collection ===
==== Still diffraction ====
The initial proof of concept publication on MicroED used lysozyme crystals. Up to 90 degrees of data were collected from a single nano crystal, with discrete 1 degree steps between frames. Each diffraction pattern was collected with an ultra-low dose rate of ~0.01 e^{−}/Å^{2}/s. Data from 3 crystals was merged to yield a 2.9Å resolution structure with good refinement statistics, enabling determination of the structure of a dose-sensitive protein from 3D microcrystals in cryogenic conditions.

==== Continuous rotation ====
MicroED uses continuous rotation during the data collection scheme. Here the crystal is slowly rotated in a single direction while diffraction is recorded on a fast camera as a movie. This led to several improvements in data quality and allowed data processing using standard X-ray crystallographic software. Continuous rotation MicroED improves sampling of reciprocal space.

=== Data processing ===
Detailed protocols for MicroED data processing have been published. When MicroED data is collected using continuous stage rotation, standard crystallography software can be used.

== Comparison with other electron diffraction methods ==
Other electron diffraction methods that have been developed and demonstrated to work include Automated Diffraction Tomography (ADT) and Rotation Electron Diffraction (RED). These methods differ slightly from MicroED: In ADT discrete steps of goniometer tilt are used to cover reciprocal space in combination with beam precession to reduce dynamical diffraction effects. ADT uses hardware and software for precession and scanning transmission electron microscopy for crystal tracking. RED is done in TEM but the goniometer is tilted in discrete steps and beam tilting is used to fill in the gaps. Software is used to process ADT and RED data.

== Milestones ==
=== Method scope ===
MicroED has been used to determine the structures of large globular proteins, small proteins, peptides, membrane proteins, organic molecules, and inorganic compounds. In many of these examples hydrogens and charged ions were observed.

=== Novel structures of α-synuclein of Parkinson's disease ===
The first structures solved by MicroED were published in late 2015. These structures were of peptide fragments that form the toxic core of α-synculein, the protein responsible for Parkinson's disease and lead to insight into the aggregation mechanism toxic aggregates. The structures were solved at 1.4 Å resolution.

=== Novel protein structure of R2lox ===
The first novel structure of a protein solved by MicroED was published in 2019. The protein is the metalloenzyme R2-like ligand-binding oxidase (R2lox) from Sulfolobus acidocaldarius. The structure was solved at 3.0 Å resolution by molecular replacement using a model of 35% sequence identity built from the closest homolog with a known structure.
