= Thermal ellipsoid =

Visual representation of atoms' thermal vibration in a crystal structure

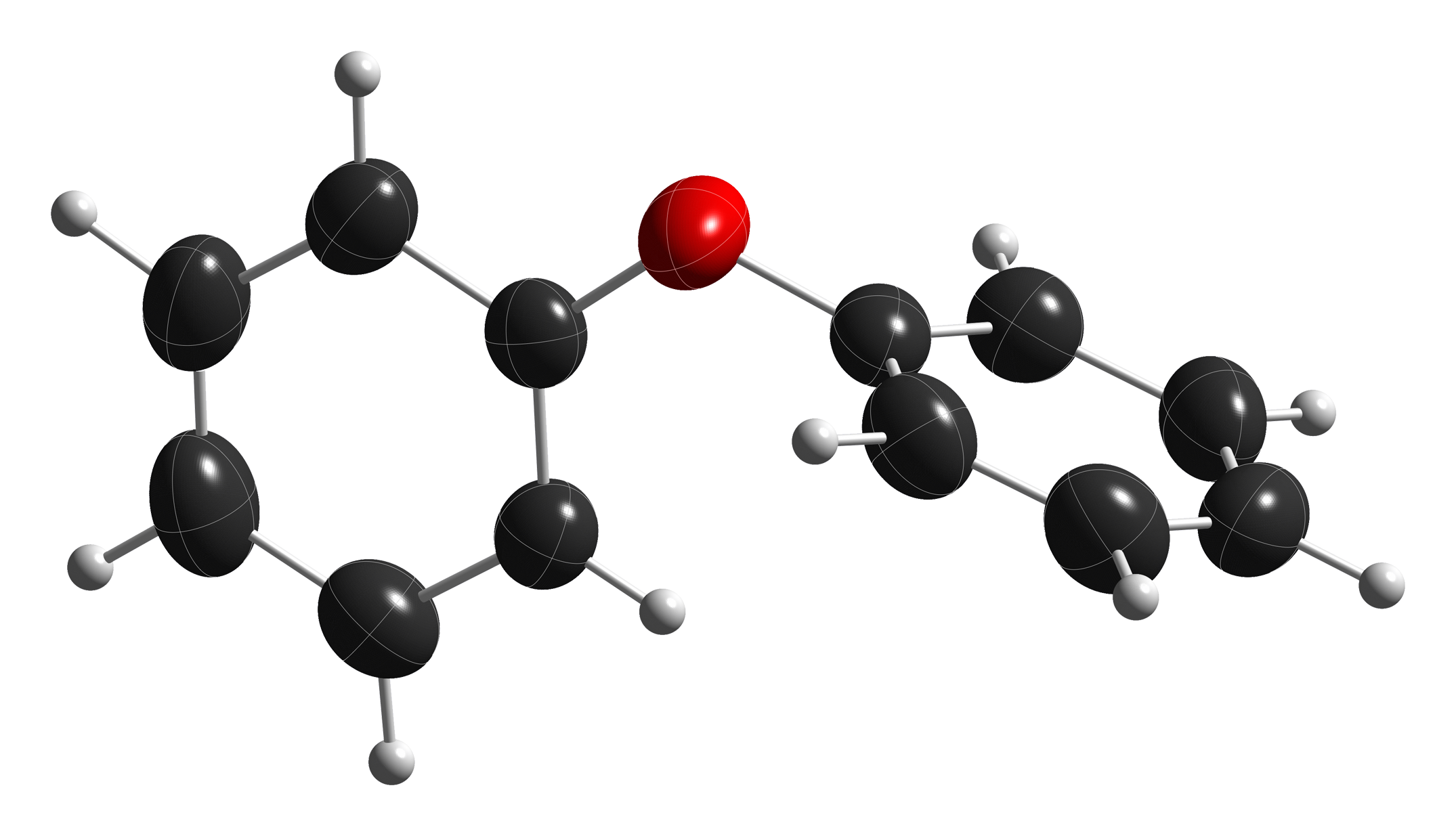
A thermal ellipsoid model of one stable conformation of the organic molecule, diphenyl ether, formulae C_{12}H_{10}O or (C_{6}H_{5})_{2}O, abbreviated Ph_{2}O. Carbons (C) are shown in black, hydrogens (H) in grey-white, and the oxygen (O) in red. The thermal ellipsoids are set at a 50% probability level, and the positions of atoms and the anisotropies of position reflected in the ellipsoids derive from a crystal structure of the molecule.

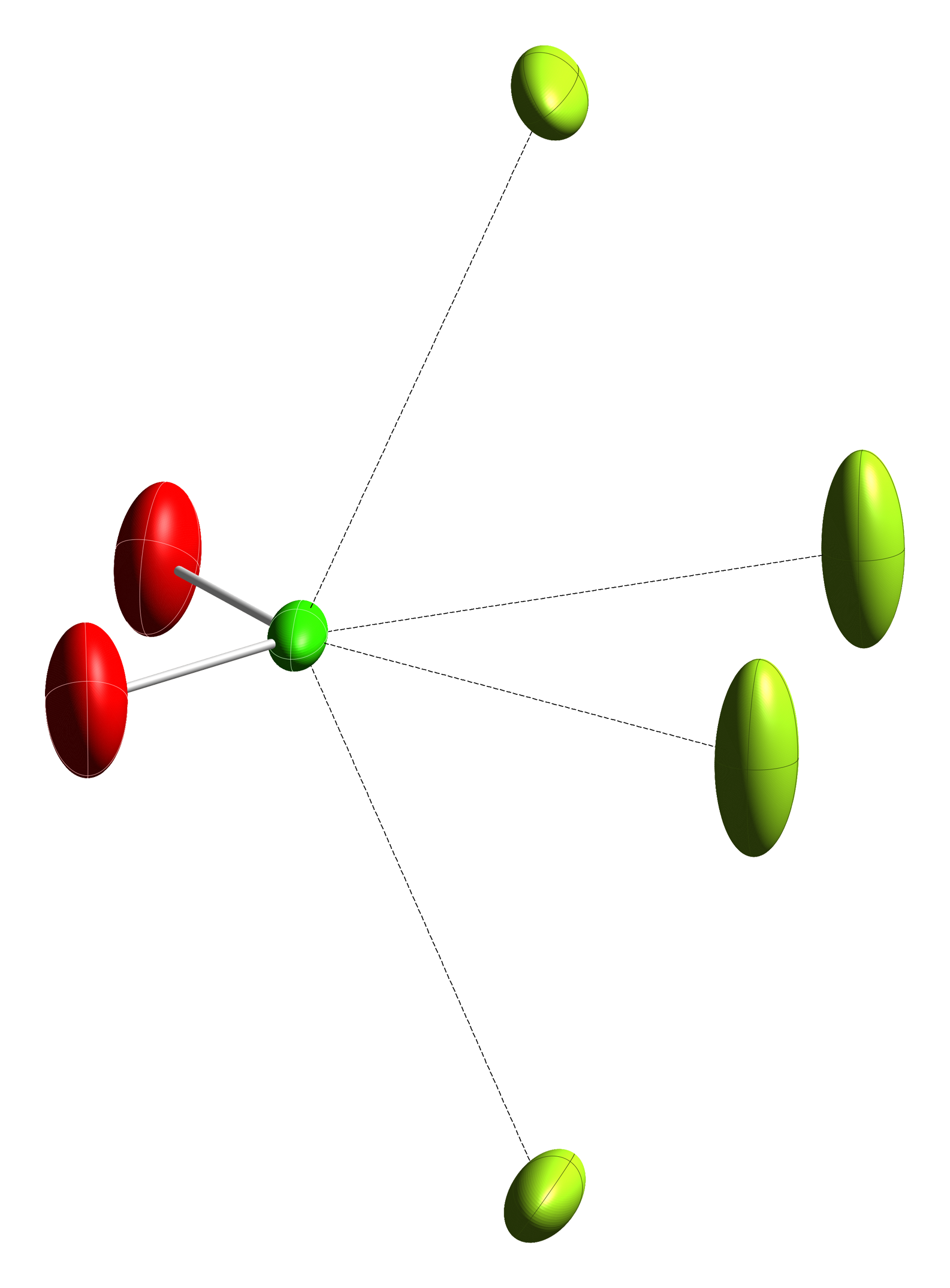
A thermal ellipsoid model of the coordination environment of the chlorine atom in ClO^{+}_{2} (the chloryl cation), in crystalline chloryl hexafluoroantimonate, formula [ClO_{2}][SbF_{6}]. The chlorine atom (Cl) is in the +5 oxidation state, and is at the center in bright green; the two oxygens (O) are in red, and four fluoride anions from a hexafluoroantimonate (SbF^{−}_{6}) anion that coordinate to the electropositive chlorine atom are shown in yellowish-green at the periphery, at right (with light lines indicating the coordinating F-Cl interactions. This reactive compound is prepared by treatment of FClO_{2} with the perfluoro-Lewis acid, SbF_{5}.

In crystallography, thermal ellipsoids, more formally termed atomic displacement parameters or anisotropic displacement parameters, are ellipsoids used to indicate the magnitudes and directions of the thermal vibration of atoms in crystal structures. Since the vibrations are usually anisotropic (different magnitudes in different directions in space), an ellipsoid is a convenient way of visualising the vibration and therefore the symmetry and time averaged position of an atom in a crystal. Their theoretical framework was introduced by D. W. J. Cruickshank in 1956 and the concept was popularized through the program ORTEP (Oak Ridge Thermal-Ellipsoid Plot Program), first released in 1965.

Thermal ellipsoids can be defined by a tensor, a mathematical object which allows the definition of magnitude and orientation of vibration with respect to three mutually perpendicular axes. The three principal axes of the thermal vibration of an atom are denoted $U_1$, $U_2$, and $U_3$, and the corresponding thermal ellipsoid is based on these axes. The size of the ellipsoid is scaled so that it occupies the space in which there is a particular probability of finding the electron density of the atom. The particular probability is usually 50%.

== See also ==
- Debye–Waller factor
