= Tamir Gonen =

American biochemist and biophysicist

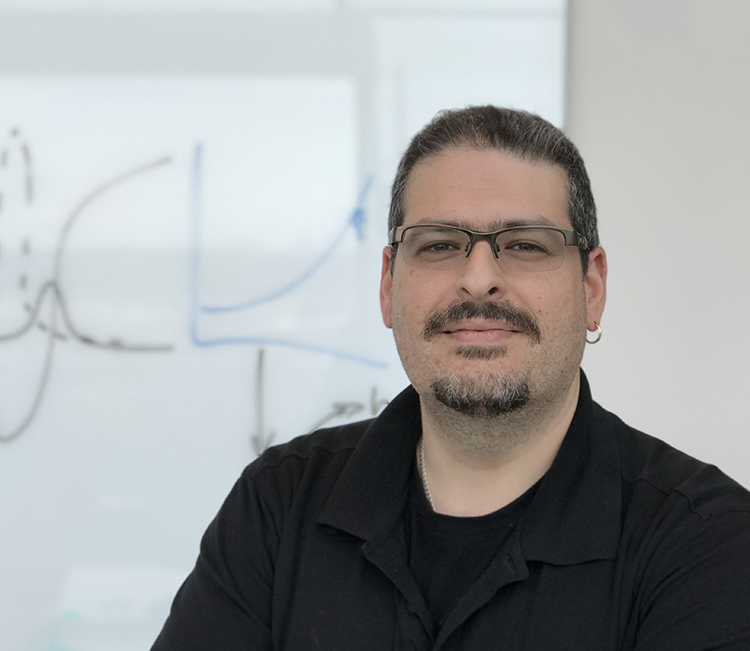
- Born: 1975 (age 50–51)
- Education: University of Auckland
- Awards: A.L. Patterson Award of the American Crystallographic Association; Carl Branden Award from the Protein Society; Fellow, American Crystallographic Association
- Scientific career
- Fields: Membrane protein Structural biology cryoEM; MicroED
- Workplaces: Howard Hughes Medical Institute; University of California, Los Angeles; Janelia Research Campus; University of Washington; Harvard Medical School
- Thesis: Novel protein-protein interactions in the lens: a solution to the Mp20 enigma
- Doctoral advisor: Edward N. Baker; Joerg Kistler
- Other academic advisors: Thomas Walz
- Website: https://cryoem.ucla.edu/

Tamir Gonen (born 1975) is an American structural biochemist and membrane biophysicist best known for his contributions to structural biology of membrane proteins, membrane biochemistry and electron cryo-microscopy (cryoEM) particularly in electron crystallography of 2D crystals and for the development of 3D electron crystallography from microscopic crystals known as MicroED. Gonen is an Investigator of the Howard Hughes Medical Institute, a professor at the University of California, Los Angeles, the founding director of the MicroED Imaging Center at UCLA and a Member of the Royal Society of New Zealand. He is a Fellow of the American Crystallographic Association.

== Education ==
Gonen attended the University of Auckland in New Zealand and graduated with a Bachelor of Science double major in Inorganic Chemistry and Biological Sciences, followed by First Class Honors in Biological Sciences in 1998. He then obtained a Doctor of Philosophy in Biological Science in 2002 from the University of Auckland for research with by Edward N. Baker and Joerg Kistler. Postdoctoral education was conducted at Harvard Medical School at the laboratory of Thomas Walz. In 2025 he was awarded a higher doctorate, Doctor of Science (DSc) from his alma mater.

== Research ==
Gonen's current research focuses on the structures and functions of medically important membrane proteins that are involved in homeostasis and method development in cryoEM, namely microcrystal electron diffraction (microED). He published the first atomic resolution structure determined by cryoEM detailing the structure of aquaporin-0 at 1.9Å resolution.

=== Development of microcrystal electron diffraction ===
The Gonen laboratory spearheaded the use of electron diffraction for the determination of protein structure from 3D nano crystals in a frozen hydrated state. The method termed microED was established in 2013 with a proof of principle paper published in eLife. In 2014 continuous rotation MicroED was established and demonstrated. In 2015 the first novel structure was determined by MicroED for the protein alpha-synuclein at 1.4Å resolution in collaboration with David Eisenberg and in 2016 microED yielded 1Å resolution data from protein nanocrystals where the phase could be solved ab initio. MicroED has been used for drug discovery, determination of membrane proteins such as ion channels materials and small organic molecules studied in a frozen hydrated state and extended to sub atomic resolution better than 0.8Å.

== Honors ==
- A.L. Patterson Award from the American Crystallographic Association (2023)
- Carl Branden Award from The Protein Society (2024)
- Fellow, American Crystallographic Association (2025)
