= Ralph Walter Graystone Wyckoff =

American crystallographer (1897–1994)

- Born: August 9, 1897; Geneva, New York
- Died: November 3, 1994 (aged 97); Tucson, Arizona
- Education: Hobart College; Cornell University
- Known for: X-ray crystallography Wyckoff positions
- Scientific career
- Workplaces: Carnegie Institution for Science; Rockefeller University; National Institutes of Health; University of Arizona
- Doctoral advisor: Louis Munroe Dennis
- Other academic advisors: Shoji Nishikawa

Ralph Walter Graystone Wyckoff, Sr. (August 9, 1897 – November 3, 1994), or simply Ralph Wyckoff, was an American chemist and pioneer of X-ray crystallography. He also made contributions to vaccine developments against epidemic typhus and other viruses.

== Biography ==
Wyckoff was the son of judge Abram Ralph Wyckoff and Ethel Agnes Catchpole. He studied at Hobart College, where he obtained a Bachelor of Science in 1916. He continued his studies at Cornell University, where he obtained his Ph.D. in 1919. In 1916, he published his first scientific paper (of more than 400) at the age of nineteen in the Journal of the American Chemical Society. Under Shoji Nishikawa, he presented his thesis about the crystallographic resolution of the structures of NaNO_{3} and CsICl_{2} in 1919.

Wyckoff continued working in X-ray crystallography and wrote several books about the topic. Wyckoff's 1922 book, The Analytical Expression of the Results of the Theory of Space Groups, contained tables with the positional coordinates, both general and special, permitted by the symmetry elements. This book was the forerunner of International Tables for X-ray Crystallography, which first appeared in 1935. Both general and special positions are also called Wyckoff positions in his honor.

In 1927, Wyckoff moved to the Rockefeller University (then called The Rockefeller Institute for Medical Research) to take up studies of bacteria and, especially, viruses. While there, he photographed the growth of living cells using ultraviolet light and determined the structure of urea. He left Rockefeller in 1937. After leaving there, he worked in private industry on the Western equine encephalitis virus. This work resulted to the creation of a vaccine against it. During World War II, he developed a vaccine against epidemic typhus. In 1943, he moved to Michigan where he worked for the University of Michigan and the Michigan State Department of Health. In Ann Arbor, he invented a technique to take three-dimensional electron microscope images of bacteria using a "metal shadowing" technique. Robley C. Williams worked with him to develop the technique. From 1946 to 1952, he researched macromolecules and viruses at the National Institutes of Health in Bethesda, Maryland. In 1948, he helped found the International Union of Crystallography and served as vice-president and president from 1951 to 1957. In 1959, appalled by growing bureaucracy at the NIH, he took the job of professor of microbiology and physics at the University of Arizona in Tucson, where he was forced to retire at the age of 80.

Wyckoff was married two times, the first time producing one son Ralph W.G. Wyckoff, Jr., the second marriage resulted in three daughters.

Wyckoff was elected member of the National Academy of Sciences in 1949 and Foreign member of the Royal Society, on April 19, 1951. He was also elected president of the Electron Microscope Society of America in 1950.

== Bibliography ==
- Wyckoff, Ralph W. G (1922). The determination of the structure of crystals. Washington. OCLC 29075986.
- Wyckoff, Ralph W. G (1922). The analytical expression of the results of the theory of space-groups. Washington: The Carnegie Institution of Washington. OCLC 1161172643.
- Wyckoff, Ralph W. G (1923). A survey of existing crystal structures data. Philadelphia and London: J.B. Lippincott Company. OCLC 796815710.
- Wyckoff, Ralph W. G (1924). The structure of crystals. New York: The Chemical Catalog Company, Inc. OCLC 3557647.
- Wyckoff, Ralph Walter Graystone (1949). Electron microscopy: technique and applications. New York: Interscience publ. OCLC 884419705.
- Wyckoff, Ralph W. G (1958). The world of the electron microscope. New Haven: Yale Univ. Press. OCLC 537057.
- Wyckoff, Ralph W. G (1972). The biochemistry of animal fossils. Bristol: Scientechnica. ISBN 978-0-85608-004-3. OCLC 925370875.
- Wyckoff, Ralph W. G (1982). Crystal structures. Malabar; Florida: R.E. Krieger. ISBN 978-0-89874-387-6. OCLC 34458678.
