= Gustaaf Van Tendeloo =

Belgian physicist (born 1950)

Gustaaf Van Tendeloo (born 1950), or Staf Van Tendeloo is a Belgian physicist known for his contributions to electron microscopy, electron crystallography, and the physics of materials. In 2011, his group reported the first atomically resolved reconstruction of a nanoparticle in 3D.

Van Tendeloo was born in Lier, Belgium. He obtained his licentiate in physics from the Vrije Universiteit Brussel (VUB; 'Free University of Brussels') in 1972, followed by his doctorate from the University of Antwerp in 1974 under the supervision of Severin Amelinckx. He received an aggregation from the VUB in 1981. Since 1972, Van Tendeloo has been associated with the University of Antwerp, where he is the professor of solid-state physics. Additionally, he serves as Professor of the Physics of Materials at the University of Antwerp. In 1986 he became part-time professor at the VUB and since 1994 he has been a full professor at the University of Antwerp. Since 2003, he has been the head of the EMAT (Electron Microscopy of Materials) laboratory on electron microscopy.

Throughout his career, Van Tendeloo has undertaken significant research endeavors both domestically and internationally, including research stints at the University of California, Berkeley, University of Illinois Urbana-Champaign and the Université de Caen. He is a member of the Royal Flemish Academy of Belgium for Science and the Arts since 2010. He received the Dr. De Leeuw-Damry-Bourlart Prize from the Research Foundation – Flanders (FWO) in 2015. In 2023, He received an honorary doctorate degree from the University of Zaragoza.

== Bibliography ==
- Amelinckx, S.; van Dyck, D.; van Landuyt, J.; van Tendeloo, G., eds. (1996-12-27). Handbook of Microscopy: Methods I: Applications in Materials Science, Solid-State Physics and Chemistry (1 ed.). Wiley. doi:10.1002/9783527620647. ISBN 978-3-527-29280-6.
- Amelinckx, S.; van Dyck, D.; van Landuyt, J.; van Tendeloo, G., eds. (1996-12-27). Handbook of Microscopy: Methods II: Applications in Materials Science, Solid-State Physics and Chemistry (1 ed.). Wiley. doi:10.1002/9783527620524. ISBN 978-3-527-29473-2.
- Amelinckx, S.; van Dyck, D.; van Landuyt, J.; van Tendeloo, G., eds. (1997-06-26). Electron Microscopy: Principles and Fundamentals (1 ed.). Wiley. doi:10.1002/9783527614561. ISBN 978-3-527-29479-4.
- Van Tendeloo, Gustaaf; Van Dyck, Dirk; Pennycook, Stephen J., eds. (2012-04-18). Handbook of Nanoscopy (1 ed.). Wiley. doi:10.1002/9783527641864. ISBN 978-3-527-31706-6.
