= Mosaicity =

Measure of the spread of crystal-plane orientations

In crystallography, mosaicity is a measure of the spread of crystal plane orientations. A mosaic crystal is an idealized model of an imperfect crystal, imagined to consist of numerous small perfect crystals (crystallites) that are to some extent randomly misoriented. Empirically, mosaicities can be determined by measuring rocking curves. Diffraction by mosaics is described by the Darwin–Hamilton equations.

The mosaic crystal model goes back to a theoretical analysis of X-ray diffraction by C. G. Darwin (1922). Currently, most studies follow Darwin in assuming a Gaussian distribution of crystallite orientations centered on some reference orientation. The mosaicity is commonly equated with the standard deviation of this distribution.

== Applications and notable materials ==
An important application of mosaic crystals is in monochromators for x-ray and neutron radiation. The mosaicity enhances the reflected flux, and allows for some phase-space transformation.

Pyrolitic graphite (PG) can be produced in form of mosaic crystals (HOPG: highly ordered PG) with controlled mosaicity of up to a few degrees.

== Diffraction by mosaic crystals: the Darwin–Hamilton equations ==
To describe diffraction by a thick mosaic crystal, it is usually assumed that the constituent crystallites are so thin that each of them reflects at most a small fraction of the incident beam. Primary extinction and other dynamical diffraction effects can then be neglected. Reflections by different crystallites add incoherently, and can therefore be treated by classical transport theory. When only beams within the scattering plane are considered, then they obey the Darwin–Hamilton equations (Darwin 1922, Hamilton 1957),

$$\mathbf{\hat k}_\pm\mathbf{\nabla} I_\pm = \mu I_\mp - (\mu+\sigma) I_\pm,$$

where $\mathbf{\hat k}$ are the directions of the incident and diffracted beam, $I_\pm$ are the corresponding currents, μ is the Bragg reflectivity, and σ accounts for losses by absorption and by thermal and elastic diffuse scattering. A generic analytical solution has been obtained remarkably late (Sears 1997; for the case σ=0 Bacon/Lowde 1948). An exact treatment must allow for three-dimensional trajectories of multiply reflected radiation. The Darwin–Hamilton equations are then replaced by a Boltzmann equation with a very special transport kernel. In most cases, resulting corrections to the Darwin–Hamilton–Sears solutions are rather small (Wuttke 2014).
