= Cornelis Wind =

Dutch physicist (1867–1911)

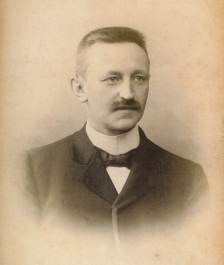
- Born: 7 November 1867; Groningen, Netherlands
- Died: 7 August 1911 (aged 23); Utrecht, Netherlands
- Scientific career
- Fields: Mathematics
- Institutions: University of Groningen

Cornelis Wind (7 November 1867 – 7 August 1911) was a Dutch physicist. Wind was a pioneer in X-ray research. He died of bone marrow damage in 1911.

== Career ==
Wind obtained his PhD in 1894 at the University of Groningen. Between 1895 and 1902 he was a lecturer in physical chemistry and mathematical physics at the University of Groningen. Wind was appointed chief director of the Royal Dutch Meteorological Institute (in Dutch: Koninklijk Nederlands Meteorologisch Instituut) in 1902. After his appointment in 1905 as a professor at the Utrecht University in mathematical physics and theoretical mechanics, he remained in different positions at the KNMI until his death in 1911. During his brief life he has initiated important developments in the fields of weather and climate science, earthquake research and research of the sea.

== Research ==
Wind previously showed the electromagnetic character of X-rays and determined their wavelength by diffraction. In their Nobel Prize lectures, both Compton and Von Laue referred to the work of Haga and Wind from 1899. In July 1911, he applied for and resigned as a member of the supervisory committee of the National Institute for the Exploration of the Sea and as a delegate of the Netherlands from the Permanent International Council for the Exploration of the Sea, based in Copenhagen.

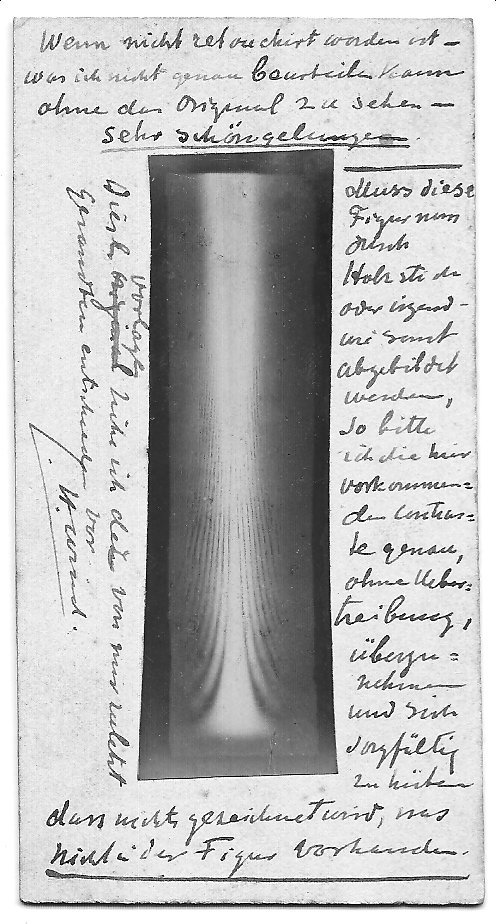
Diffraction door C. H. Wind
