= Crystal monochromator =

Device for selecting radiation wavelengths

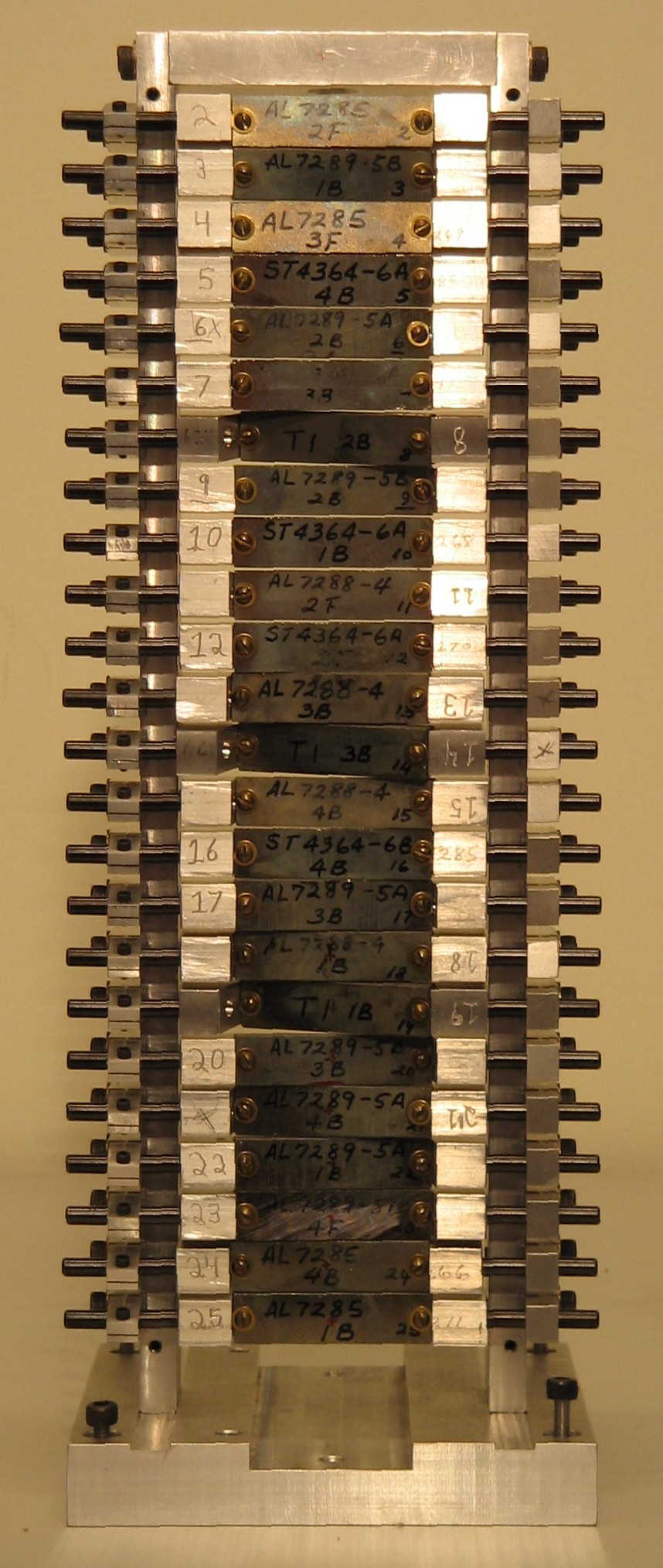
Neutron monochromator for the ECHIDNA powder diffractometer at OPAL in Australia. It is made by slabs of [113] oriented Germanium crystals which are inclined towards each other in order to focus down the Bragg reflected beam.

A crystal monochromator is a device in neutron and X-ray optics to select a defined wavelength of the radiation for further purpose on a dedicated instrument or beamline. It operates through the diffraction process according to Bragg's law.

Similar devices are called crystal analyzer for the examination of scattered radiation.

== Crystal monochromator ==
A crystal monochromator is an optical device used in X-ray and neutron spectroscopy to isolate a specific wavelength or a narrow range of wavelengths from a broader spectrum of radiation. It operates based on the principle of diffraction through a crystalline structure, governed by Bragg's Law. Crystal monochromators are integral to applications in materials science, structural biology, and high-energy physics.

== Principles of operation ==
Crystal monochromators utilize the atomic lattice structure of a crystal to diffract incident radiation at specific angles. The diffraction condition is defined by Bragg’s Law: nλ=2dsinθ Where:

- n: Order of diffraction,
- λ: Wavelength of the incident radiation,
- d: Spacing between atomic planes in the crystal,
- θ: Angle of incidence.

By adjusting the angle of the crystal, the monochromator selectively allows radiation of a desired wavelength to pass while filtering out others.

== Materials ==
Commonly used materials for crystal monochromators include:

- Silicon (Si): Offers high purity and stability, ideal for synchrotron radiation.
- Germanium (Ge): Suitable for specific wavelength ranges due to its lattice properties.
- Quartz: Used for its thermal stability in certain applications.

These materials are chosen for their well-defined crystal lattice structures and their ability to withstand the operational environment.

== Configurations ==
Crystal monochromators can be designed in various configurations:

- Flat crystal monochromators: Use a single, flat crystal to diffract radiation. They are simple and commonly employed in laboratory X-ray setups.
- Double-crystal monochromators: Consist of two crystals aligned to improve wavelength purity and minimize beam divergence.
- Bent crystal monochromators: Use curved crystals to focus the diffracted beam, enhancing intensity and resolution.

== Applications ==
Crystal monochromators are widely used in scientific and industrial research:

- X-ray diffraction (XRD): To study the atomic and molecular structure of materials.
- Synchrotron beamlines: For producing monochromatic X-rays in synchrotron radiation facilities.
- Neutron scattering: To isolate specific neutron wavelengths for scattering experiments.
- Spectroscopy: In high-resolution X-ray and neutron spectrometers to filter out unwanted wavelengths.
