= Douglas L. Dorset =

American crystallographer

Douglas (Doug) L. Dorset (August 29, 1942 – December 8, 2016) was an American crystallographer who, along with Jerome Karle, pioneered the field of electron crystallography.

Dorset studied chemistry at Juniata College in Pennsylvania, and obtained his Ph.D. at University of Maryland, Baltimore in biophysics under Albert Hybl in 1973. He worked at Roswell Park Cancer Institute and at Hauptman-Woodward Medical Research Institute. In 2000, he moved to ExxonMobil, where he investigated the structure of wax crystals and how these change in the presence of modifiers.

Dorset received the A. L. Patterson Award from the American Crystallographic Association in 2002.

== Bibliography ==
- Fryer, John R.; Dorset, Douglas L. (1991). Electron Crystallography of Organic Molecules. Dordrecht: Springer Netherlands. ISBN 978-94-011-3278-7. OCLC 840309787.
- Dorset, Douglas L. (1995). Structural electron crystallography. New York. ISBN 978-1-4757-6621-9. OCLC 861706502.
- Dorset, Douglas L.; Hovmöller, Sven; Zou, Xiaodong (1997). Electron Crystallography. Dordrecht: Springer Netherlands. ISBN 978-94-015-8971-0. OCLC 851368373.
- Dorset, Douglas L. (2005). Crystallography of the polymethylene chain : an inquiry into the structure of waxes. New York: Oxford University Press. ISBN 0-19-852908-2. OCLC 271190636.

== See also ==
- Jerome Karle
- Electron crystallography
