= Pendellösung =

Electromagnetic effect

The Pendellösung effect or phenomenon (German pronunciation: [ˈpɛndəˌløːzʊŋ], from German Pendel 'pendulum' and Lösung 'solution') is seen in diffraction in which there is a beating in the intensity of electromagnetic waves travelling within a crystal lattice. It was predicted by P. P. Ewald in 1916 and first observed in electron diffraction of magnesium oxide in 1942 by Robert D. Heidenreich and in X-ray diffraction by Norio Kato and Andrew Richard Lang in 1959.

At the exit surface of a photonic crystal (PhC), the intensity of the diffracted wave can be periodically modulated, showing a maximum in the "positive" (forward diffracted) or in the "negative" (diffracted) direction, depending on the crystal slab thickness.

The Pendellösung effect in photonic crystals can be understood as a beating phenomenon due to the phase modulation between coexisting plane wave components, propagating in the same direction.

This thickness dependence is a direct result of the so-called Pendellösung phenomenon, consisting of the periodic exchange inside the crystal of the energy between direct and diffracted beams.

The Pendellösung interference effect was predicted by dynamical diffraction and also by its fellow theories developed for visible light.
