= Wyckoff positions =

Designation of positions within a crystallographic space group

In crystallography, a Wyckoff position is any point in a set of points whose site symmetry groups (see below) are all conjugate subgroups of one another. Crystallography tables give the Wyckoff positions for different space groups. Atoms in a unit cell can be described by just their Wyckoff position and symmetry operators of the space group can be used to determine the other coordinates within a unit cell.

== History ==
The Wyckoff positions are named after Ralph Wyckoff, an American X-ray crystallographer who authored several books in the field. His 1922 book, The Analytical Expression of the Results of the Theory of Space Groups, contained tables with the positional coordinates, both general and special, permitted by the symmetry elements. This book was the forerunner of International Tables for X-ray Crystallography, which first appeared in 1935.

== Definition ==
For any point in a unit cell, given by fractional coordinates, one can apply a symmetry operation to the point. In some cases it will move to new coordinates, while in other cases the point will remain unaffected. For example, reflecting across a mirror plane will switch all the points left and right of the mirror plane, but points exactly on the mirror plane itself will not move. We can test every symmetry operation in the crystal's point group and keep track of whether the specified point is invariant under the operation or not. The (finite) list of all symmetry operations which leave the given point invariant taken together make up another group, which is known as the site symmetry group of that point. By definition, all points with the same site symmetry group, or a conjugate site symmetry group, are assigned the same Wyckoff position.

The Wyckoff positions are designated by a letter, often preceded by the number of positions that are equivalent to a given position with that letter (multiplicity), in other words the number of positions in the unit cell to which the given position is moved by applying all the elements of the space group. For instance, 2a designates the positions left where they are by a certain subgroup, and indicates that other symmetry elements move the point to a second position in the unit cell. The letters are assigned in alphabetical order with earlier letters indicating positions with fewer equivalent positions, or in other words with larger site symmetry groups. Some designations may apply to a finite number of points per unit cell (such as inversion points, improper rotation points, and intersections of rotation axes with mirror planes or other rotation axes), but other designations apply to infinite sets of points (such as generic points on rotation axes, screw axes, mirror planes, and glide planes, as well as general points not lying on any symmetry axis or plane).

Wyckoff positions are used in calculations of crystal properties. There are two types of positions: general and special.

- General positions are left invariant only for the identity operation (E). Each space group has only one general position.
- Special positions are left invariant by the identity operation and at least one other operation of the space group.

General positions have a site symmetry of the trivial group and all correspond to the same Wyckoff position. Special positions have a non-trivial site symmetry group.

For a particular space group, one can check the Wyckoff positions using International Tables of Crystallography. The table presents the multiplicity, Wyckoff letter and site symmetry for Wyckoff positions.
