= Alexander F. Wells =

British chemist and crystallographer

Alexander Frank Wells
- Born: 2 September 1912; London, England
- Died: 28 November 1994 (aged 82)
- Education: University of Oxford; University of Cambridge
- Scientific career
- Institutions: University of Birmingham; Imperial Chemical Industries; University of Connecticut
- Thesis: The Crystal Structures of Certain Complex Metallic Compounds
- Doctoral advisor: John Desmond Bernal
- Other academic advisors: Frederick George Mann

Alexander Frank Wells (2 September 1912 – 28 November 1994), or A. F. Wells, was a British chemist and crystallographer. He is known for his work on structural inorganic chemistry, which includes the description and classification of structural motifs, such as the polyhedral coordination environments, in crystals obtained from X-ray crystallography. His work is summarized in a classic reference book, Structural inorganic chemistry, first appeared in 1945 and has since gone through five editions. In addition, his work on crystal structures in terms of nets have been important and inspirational for the field of metal-organic frameworks and related materials.

== Education and career ==
Wells studied at The Queens' College, University of Oxford and obtained his BA and MA in 1934 and 1937, respectively. He then moved to University of Cambridge, where he obtained his PhD in X-ray crystallography in 1939, under the supervision of J. D. Bernal. His PhD thesis was titled The Crystal Structures of Certain Complex Metallic Compounds. He worked as research scientist at Cambridge from 1937 to 1940 and at University of Birmingham from 1940 till 1944. He moved to the industry afterwards, working as a senior research associate at Imperial Chemical Industries from 1944 to 1968. Wells was not interested in senior administrative jobs offer to him in the industry, he moved back to academia and became a professor of chemistry at University of Connecticut in the US from 1968 until his retirement in 1980.

== Personal life ==
Wells is known to his friends and family as Jumbo. He is an accomplished pianist. He married Ada Squires, then a widow, in 1939. During World War II, Wells worked on developing phosphors to be used in cathode-ray tubes and in helping service people move about in the dark.

== Bibliography ==
=== Paper series ===
- Wells, A. F. (20 September 1954). "The geometrical basis of crystal chemistry. Part 1". Acta Crystallographica. 7 (8): 535–544. doi:10.1107/S0365110X5400182X.
- Wells, A. F. (20 September 1954). "The geometrical basis of crystal chemistry. Part 2". Acta Crystallographica. 7 (8): 545–554. doi:10.1107/S0365110X54001831.
- Wells, A. F. (December 1954). "The geometrical basis of crystal chemistry. Part 3". Acta Crystallographica. 7 (12): 842–848. doi:10.1107/S0365110X54002575.
- Wells, A. F. (December 1954). "The geometrical basis of crystal chemistry. Part 4". Acta Crystallographica. 7 (12): 849–853. doi:10.1107/S0365110X54002587.
- Wells, A. F. (1955). "The geometrical basis of crystal chemistry. Part 5". Acta Crystallographica. 8 (1): 32–36. doi:10.1107/S0365110X5500008X.
- Wells, A. F. (1956). "The geometrical basis of crystal chemistry. Part 6". Acta Crystallographica. 9 (1): 23–28. doi:10.1107/S0365110X56000048.
- Wells, A. F.; Sharpe, R. R. (10 September 1963). "The geometrical basis of crystal chemistry. VII. On three-dimensional polyhedra and networks". Acta Crystallographica. 16 (9): 857–871. doi:10.1107/S0365110X63002358.
- Wells, A. F. (10 May 1965). "The geometrical basis of crystal chemistry. VIII". Acta Crystallographica. 18 (5): 894–900. doi:10.1107/S0365110X65002177.
- Wells, A. F. (23 January 1968). "The geometrical basis of crystal chemistry. IX. Some properties of plane nets". Acta Crystallographica Section B Structural Crystallography and Crystal Chemistry. 24 (1): 50–57. doi:10.1107/S056774086800169X.
- Wells, A. F. (September 1969). "The geometrical basis of crystal chemistry. X. Further study of three-dimensional polyhedra". Acta Crystallographica Section B Structural Crystallography and Crystal Chemistry. 25 (9): 1711–1719. doi:10.1107/S0567740869004626.
- Wells, A. F. (15 March 1972). "The geometrical basis of crystal chemistry. XI. Further study of 3-dimensional 3-connected nets". Acta Crystallographica Section B Structural Crystallography and Crystal Chemistry. 28 (3): 711–713. doi:10.1107/S0567740872003061.
- Wells, A. F. (September 1976). "The geometrical basis of crystal chemistry. XII. Review of structures on three-dimensional 3-connected nets". Acta Crystallographica Section B Structural Crystallography and Crystal Chemistry. 32 (9): 2619–2626. doi:10.1107/S0567740876008376.

=== Other selected papers ===
- Mann, F. G.; Wells, A. F. (18 September 1937). "Phosphine and Arsine Derivatives of the Group 1(b) Metals: Volatile Derivatives of Gold". Nature. 140 (3542): 502. Bibcode:1937Natur.140..502M. doi:10.1038/140502a0. S2CID 4035865.
- Powell, H. M.; Clark, D.; Wells, A. F. (27 January 1940). "Crystal Structure of Phosphorus Pentachloride". Nature. 145 (3665): 149. Bibcode:1940Natur.145..149P. doi:10.1038/145149a0. S2CID 4090413.
- Wells, A.F. (1 August 1940). "X. Finite complexes in crystals: a classification and review". The London, Edinburgh, and Dublin Philosophical Magazine and Journal of Science. 30 (199): 103–134. doi:10.1080/14786444008520702.
- Clark, D.; Powell, H. M.; Wells, A. F. (1942). "134. The crystal structure of phosphorus pentachloride". Journal of the Chemical Society: 642–645. doi:10.1039/jr9420000642.
- Wells, A. F. (21 April 1945). "Relation of Crystallography to Chemistry". Nature. 155 (3938): 468–471. Bibcode:1945Natur.155..468W. doi:10.1038/155468a0. S2CID 35181108.
- Wells, A. F. (1947). "332. The crystal structure of CsCuCl3 and the crystal chemistry of complex halides ABX3". Journal of the Chemical Society: 1662–1670. doi:10.1039/jr9470001662.
- Wells, A. F. (1947). "333. The crystal structure of anhydrous cupric chloride, and the stereochemistry of the cupric atom". Journal of the Chemical Society: 1670–1675. doi:10.1039/jr9470001670.
- Wells, A. F. (1948). "The structures of metallic oxides". Quarterly Reviews, Chemical Society. 2 (3): 185. doi:10.1039/qr9480200185.
- Wells, A. F. (1949). "12. Bond lengths in some inorganic molecules and complex ions". Journal of the Chemical Society: 55–67. doi:10.1039/jr9490000055.
- Wells, A. F. (2 May 1951). "Malachite: re-examination of crystal structure". Acta Crystallographica. 4 (3): 200–204. doi:10.1107/S0365110X51000714.
- Wells, A. F. (1954). "The crystal structures of salt hydrates and complex halides". Quarterly Reviews, Chemical Society. 8 (4): 380. doi:10.1039/qr9540800380.
- Wells, A.F. (1958). The Structures of Crystals. Solid State Physics. Vol. 7. pp. 425–503. doi:10.1016/s0081-1947(08)60556-1. ISBN 978-0-12-607707-0.
- Strong, S. L.; Wells, A. F.; Kaplow, R. (15 August 1971). "On the crystal structure of B2O3". Acta Crystallographica Section B: Structural Crystallography and Crystal Chemistry. 27 (8): 1662–1663. doi:10.1107/S0567740871004515.
- Wells, A.F. (1973). "The octahedron in chemistry". Journal of Solid State Chemistry. 6 (4): 469–478. Bibcode:1973JSSCh...6..469W. doi:10.1016/S0022-4596(73)80003-9.
- Wells, A.F. (1984). "Structures based on the 3-connected net 10^{3}-b". Journal of Solid State Chemistry. 54 (3): 378–388. Bibcode:1984JSSCh..54..378W. doi:10.1016/0022-4596(84)90169-5.
- Wells, A. F. (28 August 1986). "Survey of tetrahedral structures". Philosophical Transactions of the Royal Society of London. Series A, Mathematical and Physical Sciences. 319 (1548): 291–335. Bibcode:1986RSPTA.319..291W. doi:10.1098/rsta.1986.0100. S2CID 123478741.

=== Books ===
- Wells, A. F. (1956). The third dimension in chemistry. Oxford: Clarendon Press. OCLC 310091153.
- Wells, A. F. (1970). Models in structural inorganic chemistry. Oxford: Clarendon Press. ISBN 0-19-855126-6. OCLC 638794788.
- Wells, A. F. (1977). Three-dimensional nets and polyhedra. New York: Wiley. ISBN 0-471-02151-2. OCLC 2543055.
- Wells, A. F. (1979). Further studies of three-dimensional nets. New York: American Crystallographic Association. ISBN 0-88318-259-9. OCLC 6329923.
- Wells, A. F. (2012). Structural inorganic chemistry (5th ed.). Oxford: Oxford University Press. ISBN 978-0-19-965763-6. OCLC 801026482.

== See also ==
- Periodic graph (crystallography)
- Coordination geometry
- Michael O'Keeffe (chemist)
- List of books about polyhedra
