= David W. Green (biochemist) =

English crystallographer and biochemist

- Died: 1976
- Education: University of Cambridge (Ph.D.)
- Occupation: Crystallographer
- Employer: University of Edinburgh

David W. Green ( - 1976) was a crystallographer at the Medical Research Council Unit for the Study of the Molecular Structure of Biological Systems, Cavendish Laboratory, University of Cambridge.

David W. Green was a graduate student in the laboratory of Max Perutz at the University of Cambridge from 1952 to 1955 and obtained a Ph.D. He is known for demonstrating the first use of isomorphous replacement to solve the phase problem in X-ray crystallography.

After completing his Ph.D., Green moved to the Davy-Faraday Research Laboratory at The Royal Institution in autumn 1955.

He was recruited by Linus Pauling but ultimately moved to MIT to work with Alexander Rich. With Rich, Green solved the structure of N-methyluracil. After his postdoctoral work, he returned to the Davy-Faraday Research Laboratory at The Royal Institution in London, England to continue his crystallographic research. Later he moved to the Department of Physics at the University of Edinburgh. In Edinburgh, Green was a senior lecturer and ran a group in solid state physics.

Green died in 1976.
