= John Monteath Robertson =

Scottish chemist and crystallographer

John Monteath Robertson CBE FRS FRSE FCS
- Born: 24 July 1900; Nether Fordun farm near Auchterarder
- Died: 27 December 1989 (aged 89)
- Education: University of Glasgow
- Occupation: Chemist
- Awards: Tilden Prize (1944)
- Scientific career
- Doctoral advisor: G. G. Henderson
- Other academic advisors: William Henry Bragg
- Doctoral students: Jack D. Dunitz; Michael Rossmann

John Monteath Robertson (24 July 1900 – 27 December 1989) was a Scottish chemist and crystallographer. He was the recipient of the Davy Medal in 1960 and president of the Chemical Society from 1962 to 1964.

== Life ==
He was born on 24 July 1900 at Nether Fordun farm near Auchterarder the son of William Robertson, farmer, and his wife, Jeannie Monteath. He was educated at Auchterarder Primary School then Perth Academy. He then studied chemistry at Glasgow University graduating BSc in 1923, MA in 1925. He then continued as a postgraduate gaining his first doctorate (PhD) in 1926. Under the advisement of G. G. Henderson, he produced a doctoral thesis entitled "The structural relationships of certain members of the bicyclic sesquiterpene series". In his graduate work, he crystallized sesquiterpene derivatives and gave them to William Henry Bragg for X-ray diffraction. He sent a caryophyllene alcohol. The structure was not solved until approximately 30 years later.

In 1926, he began work as a researcher at the Royal Institution in London, under the tutelage of Bragg. He continued to work on sesquiterpene derivatives, but also shifted his attention to physics. In 1928 he obtained a post in physics at the University of Michigan in the United States, but returned to the Royal Institution at the Davy-Faraday Laboratory in 1930. During that time, he solved many small, organic molecule structures by X-ray crystallography. In particular, he reported the structures of several novel phthalocyanines. Robertson used heavy-metal derivatives to solve the phase problem by Isomorphous replacement, which paved the way to determine novel structures.

In 1939 he moved to Sheffield University as senior lecturer in physical chemistry. This was interrupted by the Second World War (from 1942) he served as chemical advisor to Bomber Command and scientific advisor to the RAF. From 1942 he was professor and department head of chemistry at Glasgow University. At University of Glasgow, he trained a number of students:

"Among those who began X-ray work with me in Glasgow after the war are A. McL. Mathieson and J. D. Morrison (now mass spectrometry) in Melbourne, Maria Przybylska in Ottawa, J. G. White in Princeton, Jack Dunitz in Zurich, Sidney Abrahams with Bell Telephones in New York, Walter Macintyre in Boulder, James Trotter in Vancouver, M. G. Rossmann in Cambridge, H. M. M. Shearer in Durham, and J. S. Broadley and D. M. Donaldson at Dounreay, Thurso (now atomic energy). Ian Dawson (now electron microscopy), J. C. Speakman, George Sim, Tom Hamor and Andrew Porte (now nuclear magnetic resonance) are all back in Glasgow again, after adventures in other places, and are actively participating in our latest and most exciting work."

In 1960, Robertson's group reported the structure of limonin, a complex organic molecule whose structure had eluded chemists since its discovery in 1841. With the structure, Robertson's group also demonstrated a clear path to apply novel computational techniques to solve the phase problem for complex organic molecules by using heavy-metal derivatives. This was a continuation of his previous work phasing organic molecules.

In 1943 he was elected a Fellow of the Royal Society of Edinburgh. His proposers were James Wilfred Cook, Thomas Alty, Edward Hindle, John Walton and James Pickering Kendall. In 1945 he was elected a Fellow of the Royal Society of London. In the 1962 Birthday Honours he was created a Commander of the Order of the British Empire. In 1963 he received an honorary doctorate (LLD) from Aberdeen University.

He retired in 1970 and died in Inverness on 27 December 1989.

== Family ==
In 1930 he married Stella Kennard (née Nairn) in Toronto.
