= Isomorphous replacement =

Isomorphous replacement (IR) is historically the most common approach to solving the phase problem in X-ray crystallography studies of proteins. For protein crystals this method is conducted by soaking the crystal of a sample to be analyzed with a heavy atom solution or co-crystallization with the heavy atom. The addition of the heavy atom (or ion) to the structure should not affect the crystal formation or unit cell dimensions in comparison to its native form, hence, they should be isomorphic.

Data sets from the native and heavy-atom derivative of the sample are first collected. Then the interpretation of the Patterson difference map reveals the heavy atom's location in the unit cell. This allows both the amplitude and the phase of the heavy-atom contribution to be determined. Since the structure factor of the heavy atom derivative (F_{ph}) of the crystal is the vector sum of the lone heavy atom (F_{h}) and the native crystal (F_{p}) then the phase of the native F_{p} and F_{ph} vectors can be solved geometrically.

$$\mathbf F_{ph} = \mathbf F_p + \mathbf F_h$$

The most common form is multiple isomorphous replacement (MIR), which uses at least two isomorphous derivatives. Single isomorphous replacement is possible, but gives an ambiguous result with two possible phases; density modification is required to resolve the ambiguity. There are also forms that also take into account the anomalous X-ray scattering of the soaked heavy atoms, called MIRAS and SIRAS respectively.

== Development ==
=== Single isomorphous replacement (SIR) ===
Early demonstrations of isomorphous replacement in crystallography come from James M. Cork, John Monteath Robertson, and others. An early demonstration of isomorphous replacement in crystallography came in 1927 with a paper reporting the x-ray crystal structures of a series of alum compounds from Cork. The alum compounds studied had the general formula A^{.}B^{.}(SO_{4})_{2}^{.}12H_{2}O, where A was a monovalent metallic ion (NH4^{+}, K^{+}, Rb^{+}, Cs^{+}, or Tl^{+}), B was a trivalent metallic ion (Al^{3+}, Cr^{3+}, or Fe^{3+}) and S was usually sulfur, but could also be selenium or tellurium. Because the alum crystals were largely isomorphous when the heavy atoms were changed out, they could be phased by isomorphous replacement. Fourier analysis was used to find the heavy atom positions.

The first demonstration of isomorphous replacement in protein crystallography was in 1954 with a paper from David W. Green, Vernon Ingram, and Max Perutz.

== Examples ==
Some examples of heavy atoms used in protein MIR:

- Hg^{2+} ions bind to thiol groups.
- Uranyl salts (UO_{2} + NO_{3}) bind between carboxyl groups in Asp and Glu
- Lead binds to Cys residues.
- PtCl_{4}^{2−} (ion) bind to His

== See also ==
=== Anomalous diffraction ===
- Multi-wavelength anomalous diffraction (MAD)
- Single-wavelength anomalous diffraction (SAD)

=== Other ===
- Patterson map
