= Arthur Lindo Patterson =

British crystallographer (1902–1966)

- Born: 23 July 1902; Nelson, New Zealand
- Died: 6 November 1966 (aged 64); Philadelphia, Pennsylvania, U.S.
- Known for: Patterson function; particle-size line broadening
- Scientific career
- Fields: Physics, chemistry
- Workplaces: McGill University; M.I.T; International Union of Crystallography; Institute for Cancer Research

Arthur Lindo Patterson (23 July 1902, Nelson, New Zealand – 6 November 1966, Philadelphia, Pennsylvania) was a pioneering British X-ray crystallographer. Patterson was born to British parents in New Zealand in 1902. Shortly afterwards the family moved to Montreal, Canada and later to London, England. In 1920 Patterson moved to Canada for college at McGill University, Montreal. Firstly he concentrated on Mathematics and then changed his major to Physics. He received his bachelor's degree in 1923 and a master's in 1924. His master's thesis was on the production of hard X-rays by interaction of radium β rays with solids.

From 1924 to 1926 he worked in London in the laboratory of W. H. Bragg, where he learnt the art of crystal structure analysis.

In 1926 Patterson moved to the Kaiser Wilhelm Institute for Fibrous Materials Chemistry (later the Fritz Haber Institute) in the Dahlem neighbourhood of Berlin, where he worked on the X-ray crystallography of cellulose fibres. In Berlin he had the fortune to meet the scientific elite of the time, which included Max von Laue, Albert Einstein, Max Planck, Walther Nernst, Hans Bethe, Otto Hahn, Lise Meitner and Peter Pringsheim.

In 1927 he returned to McGill, finishing his work for the PhD degree in 1928.

From 1933 to 1946, Patterson was a visiting researcher in the laboratory of Bertram Eugene Warren (1902–1991) at MIT. It was during this time that he published his famous function, now called the Patterson function, which subsequently developed into an extremely important theoretical tool in X-ray crystal structure analysis, especially when one or more heavy atoms are present in the structure.

From 1936 to 1949, he taught at Bryn Mawr College, and from 1949 to 1966, he was a faculty member at the Institute for Cancer Research, now the Fox Chase Cancer Center in Philadelphia.

== Achievements ==
His work led to some of the first important contributions to the theory of particle-size line broadening. In 1934, while at Massachusetts Institute of Technology, he developed a method of solving crystal structures, the Patterson function, which involves the summing of the Fourier series in two and three dimensions. In addition he became concerned about the problem of uniqueness of the deconvolution of the Patterson function and was able to show that under some conditions several different atomic arrangements — homometric structures — could exist that would give the same Patterson function and therefore the same intensities in reciprocal space.

== See also ==
- Patterson function
- Structure factor
