= X-ray diffraction =

Elastic interaction of x-rays with electrons

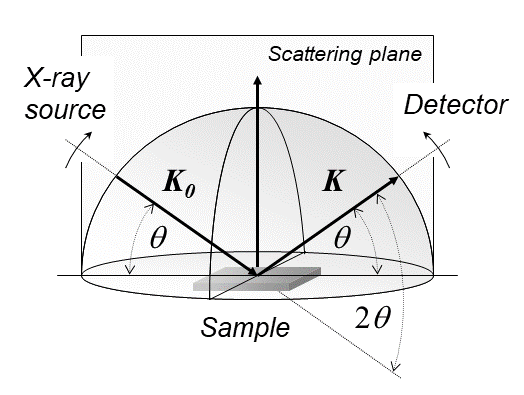
Hemisphere of Diffraction

X-ray diffraction is a generic term for phenomena associated with changes in the direction of X-ray beams due to interactions with the electrons around atoms. It occurs due to elastic scattering, when there is no change in the energy of the waves. The resulting map of the directions of the X-rays far from the sample is called a diffraction pattern. It is different from X-ray crystallography which exploits X-ray diffraction to determine the arrangement of atoms in materials, and also has other components such as ways to map from experimental diffraction measurements to the positions of atoms.

This article provides an overview of X-ray diffraction, starting with the early history of x-rays and the discovery that they have the right spacings to be diffracted by crystals. In many cases these diffraction patterns can be Interpreted using a single scattering or kinematical theory with conservation of energy (wave vector). Many different types of X-ray sources exist, ranging from ones used in laboratories to higher brightness synchrotron light sources. Similar diffraction patterns can be produced by related scattering techniques such as electron diffraction or neutron diffraction. If single crystals of sufficient size cannot be obtained, various other X-ray methods can be applied to obtain less detailed information; such methods include fiber diffraction, powder diffraction and (if the sample is not crystallized) small-angle X-ray scattering (SAXS).

== History ==
When Wilhelm Röntgen discovered X-rays in 1895 physicists were uncertain of the nature of X-rays, but suspected that they were waves of electromagnetic radiation. The Maxwell theory of electromagnetic radiation was well accepted, and experiments by Charles Glover Barkla showed that X-rays exhibited phenomena associated with electromagnetic waves, including transverse polarization and spectral lines akin to those observed in the visible wavelengths. Barkla created the x-ray notation for sharp spectral lines, noting in 1909 two separate energies, at first, naming them "A" and "B" and, supposing that there may be lines prior to "A", he started an alphabet numbering beginning with "K." Single-slit experiments in the laboratory of Arnold Sommerfeld suggested that X-rays had a wavelength of about 1 angstrom. X-rays are not only waves but also have particle properties causing Sommerfeld to coin the name Bremsstrahlung for the continuous spectra when they were formed when electrons bombarded a material. Albert Einstein introduced the photon concept in 1905, but it was not broadly accepted until 1922, when Arthur Compton confirmed it by the scattering of X-rays from electrons. The particle-like properties of X-rays, such as their ionization of gases, had prompted William Henry Bragg to argue in 1907 that X-rays were not electromagnetic radiation. Bragg's view proved unpopular and the observation of X-ray diffraction by Max von Laue in 1912 confirmed that X-rays are a form of electromagnetic radiation.

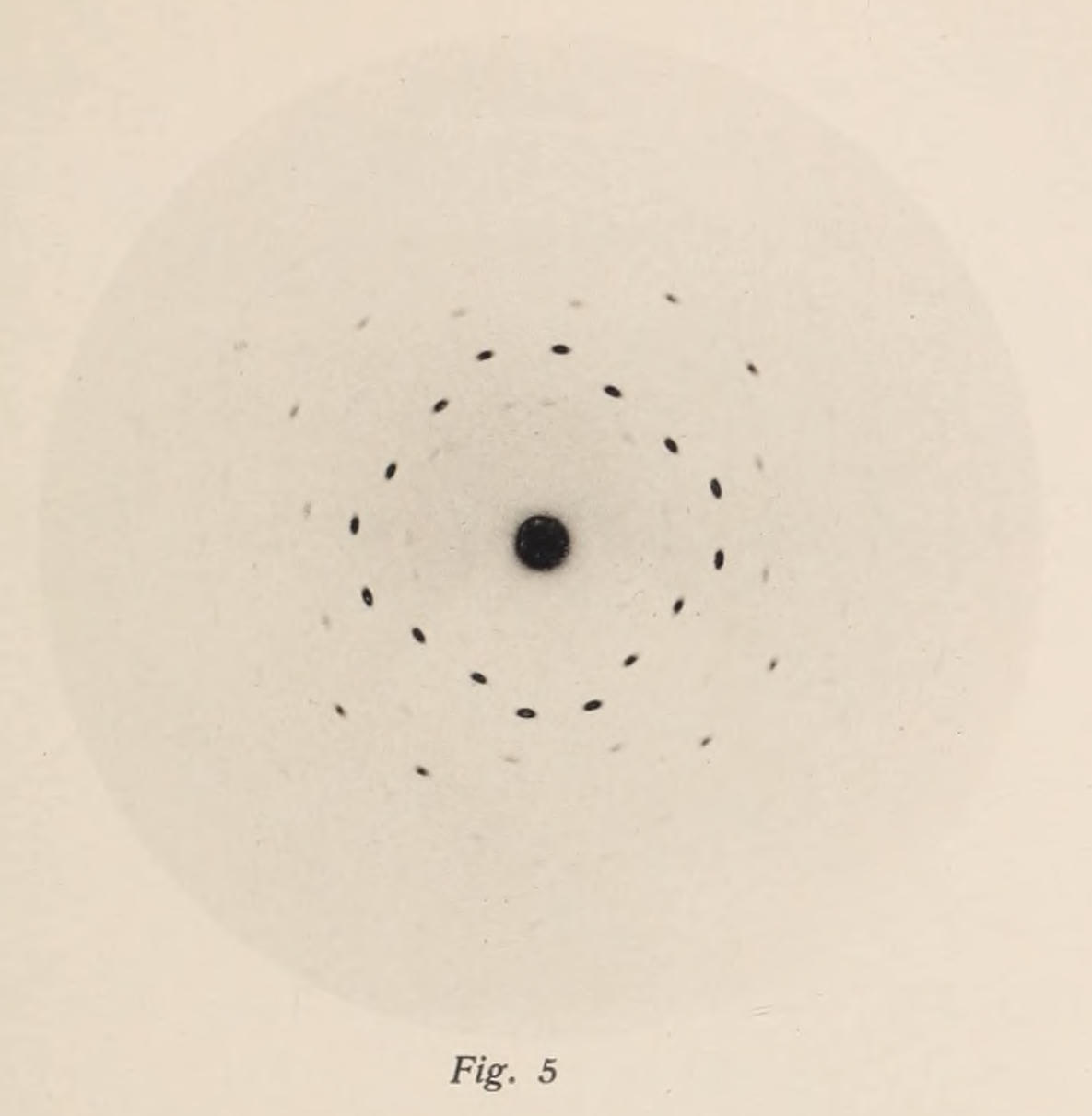
One of the zinc blende X-ray interference patterns published in Von Laue's 1912 paper

The idea that crystals could be used as a diffraction grating for X-rays arose in 1912 in a conversation between Paul Peter Ewald and Max von Laue in the English Garden in Munich. Ewald had proposed a resonator model of crystals for his thesis, but this model could not be validated using visible light, since the wavelength was much larger than the spacing between the resonators. Von Laue realized that electromagnetic radiation of a shorter wavelength was needed, and suggested that X-rays might have a wavelength comparable to the spacing in crystals. Von Laue worked with two technicians, Walter Friedrich and his assistant Paul Knipping, to shine a beam of X-rays through a copper sulfate crystal and record its diffraction pattern on a photographic plate. After being developed, the plate showed rings of fuzzy spots of roughly elliptical shape. Despite the crude and unclear image, the image confirmed the diffraction concept. The results were presented to the Bavarian Academy of Sciences and Humanities in June 1912 as "Interferenz-Erscheinungen bei Röntgenstrahlen" (Interference phenomena in X-rays).

After seeing the initial results, Laue was walking home and suddenly conceived of the physical laws describing the effect. Laue developed a law that connects the scattering angles and the size and orientation of the unit-cell spacings in the crystal, for which he was awarded the Nobel Prize in Physics in 1914.

After Von Laue's pioneering research the field developed rapidly, most notably by physicists William Lawrence Bragg and his father William Henry Bragg. In 1912–1913, the younger Bragg developed Bragg's law, which connects the scattering with evenly spaced planes within a crystal. The Braggs, father and son, shared the 1915 Nobel Prize in Physics for their work in crystallography. The earliest structures were generally simple; as computational and experimental methods improved over the next decades, it became feasible to deduce reliable atomic positions for more complicated arrangements of atoms; see X-ray crystallography for more details.

== Introduction to x-ray diffraction theory ==
=== Basics ===
The incoming beam (coming from upper left) causes each scatterer to re-radiate a small portion of its intensity as a spherical wave. If scatterers are arranged symmetrically with a separation d, these spherical waves will be in sync (add constructively) only in directions where their path-length difference 2d sin θ equals an integer multiple of the wavelength λ. In that case, part of the incoming beam is deflected by an angle 2θ, producing a reflection spot in the diffraction pattern.

Crystals are regular arrays of atoms, and X-rays are electromagnetic waves. Atoms scatter X-ray waves, primarily through the atoms' electrons. Just as an ocean wave striking a lighthouse produces secondary circular waves emanating from the lighthouse, so an X-ray striking an electron produces secondary spherical waves emanating from the electron. This phenomenon is known as elastic scattering, and the electron (or lighthouse) is known as the scatterer. A regular array of scatterers produces a regular array of spherical waves. Although these waves cancel one another out in most directions through destructive interference, they add constructively in a few specific directions.

An intuitive understanding of X-ray diffraction can be obtained from the Bragg model of diffraction. In this model, a given reflection is associated with a set of evenly spaced sheets running through the crystal, usually passing through the centers of the atoms of the crystal lattice. The orientation of a particular set of sheets is identified by its three Miller indices (h, k, l), and their spacing by d. William Lawrence Bragg proposed a model where the incoming X-rays are scattered specularly (mirror-like) from each plane; from that assumption, X-rays scattered from adjacent planes will combine constructively (constructive interference) when the angle θ between the plane and the X-ray results in a path-length difference that is an integer multiple n of the X-ray wavelength λ.

$$2 d\sin\theta = n\lambda.$$

A reflection is said to be indexed when its Miller indices (or, more correctly, its reciprocal lattice vector components) have been identified from the known wavelength and the scattering angle 2θ. Such indexing gives the unit-cell parameters, the lengths and angles of the unit-cell, as well as its space group.

=== Ewald's sphere ===
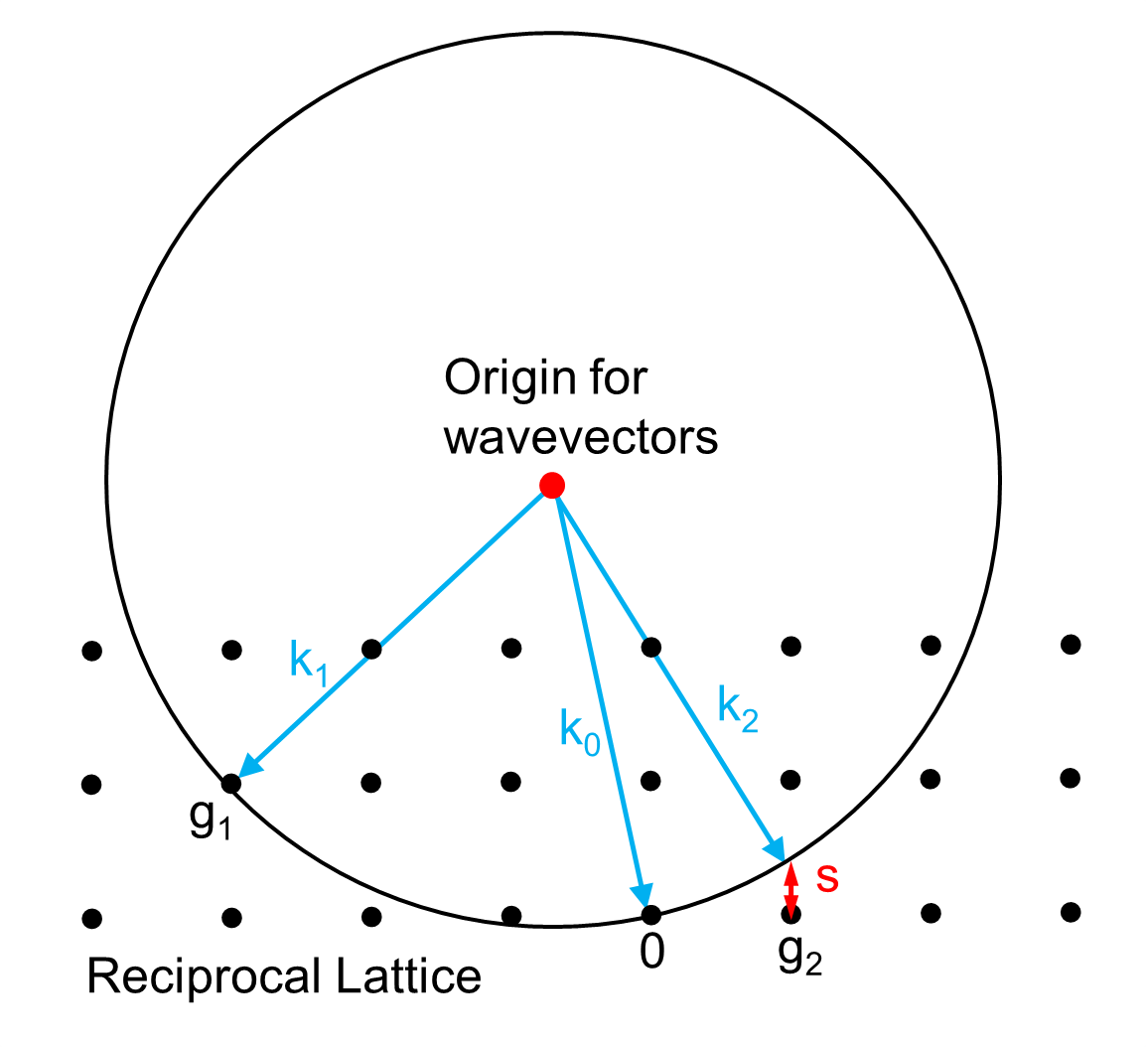
Representation of the Ewald construction for elastic diffraction of x-rays.

Each X-ray diffraction pattern represents a spherical slice of reciprocal space, as may be seen by the Ewald sphere construction. For a given incident wavevector k_{0} the only wavevectors with the same energy lie on the surface of a sphere. In the diagram, the wavevector k_{1} lies on the Ewald sphere and also is at a reciprocal lattice vector g_{1} so satisfies Bragg's law. In contrast the wavevector k_{2} differs from the reciprocal lattice point and g_{2} by the vector s which is called the excitation error. For large single crystals primarily used in crystallography only the Bragg's law case matters; for electron diffraction and some other types of x-ray diffraction non-zero values of the excitation error also matter.

=== Scattering amplitudes ===
X-ray scattering is determined by the density of electrons within the crystal. Since the energy of an X-ray is much greater than that of a valence electron, the scattering may be modeled as Thomson scattering, the elastic interaction of an electromagnetic ray with a charged particle.

The intensity of Thomson scattering for one particle with mass m and elementary charge q is:

$$I_o = I_e \left(\frac{q^4}{m^2c^4}\right)\frac{1+\cos^22\theta}{2} = I_e7.94\times10^{-26}\frac{1+\cos^22\theta}{2} = I_ef$$

Hence the atomic nuclei, which are much heavier than an electron, contribute negligibly to the scattered X-rays. Consequently, the coherent scattering detected from an atom can be accurately approximated by analyzing the collective scattering from the electrons in the system.

The incoming X-ray beam has a polarization and should be represented as a vector wave; however, for simplicity, it will be represented here as a scalar wave. We will ignore the time dependence of the wave and just concentrate on the wave's spatial dependence. Plane waves can be represented by a wave vector k_{in}, and so the incoming wave at time t = 0 is given by

$$A \mathrm{e}^{2\pi \mathrm{i}\mathbf{k}_{\mathrm{in}} \cdot \mathbf{r}}.$$

At a position r within the sample, consider a density of scatterers f(r); these scatterers produce a scattered spherical wave of amplitude proportional to the local amplitude of the incoming wave times the number of scatterers in a small volume dV about r

$$\text{amplitude of scattered wave} = A \mathrm{e}^{2\pi \mathrm{i}\mathbf{k} \cdot \mathbf{r}} S f(\mathbf{r}) \, \mathrm{d}V,$$

where S is the proportionality constant.

Consider the fraction of scattered waves that leave with an outgoing wave-vector of k_{out} and strike a screen (detector) at r_{screen}. Since no energy is lost (elastic, not inelastic scattering), the wavelengths are the same as are the magnitudes of the wave-vectors |k_{in}| = |k_{out}|. From the time that the photon is scattered at r until it is absorbed at r_{screen}, the photon undergoes a change in phase

$$e^{2\pi i \mathbf{k}_\text{out} \cdot \left( \mathbf{r}_\text{screen} - \mathbf{r} \right)}.$$

The net radiation arriving at r_{screen} is the sum of all the scattered waves throughout the crystal

$$A S \int \mathrm{d}\mathbf{r} \, f(\mathbf{r}) \mathrm{e}^{2\pi \mathrm{i} \mathbf{k}_\text{in} \cdot \mathbf{r}}
e^{2\pi i \mathbf{k}_\text{out} \cdot \left( \mathbf{r}_\text{screen} - \mathbf{r} \right)} =
A S e^{2\pi i \mathbf{k}_\text{out} \cdot \mathbf{r}_\text{screen}}
\int \mathrm{d}\mathbf{r} \, f(\mathbf{r}) \mathrm{e}^{2\pi \mathrm{i} \left( \mathbf{k}_\text{in} - \mathbf{k}_\text{out} \right) \cdot \mathbf{r}},$$

which may be written as a Fourier transform

$$A S \mathrm{e}^{2\pi \mathrm{i} \mathbf{k}_\text{out} \cdot \mathbf{r}_\text{screen}}
\int d\mathbf{r} f(\mathbf{r}) \mathrm{e}^{-2\pi \mathrm{i} \mathbf{g} \cdot \mathbf{r}} =
A S \mathrm{e}^{2\pi \mathrm{i} \mathbf{k}_\text{out} \cdot \mathbf{r}_\text{screen}} F(\mathbf{g}),$$

where g = k_{out} – k_{in} is a reciprocal lattice vector that satisfies Bragg's law and the Ewald construction mentioned above. The measured intensity of the reflection will be square of this amplitude

$$A^2 S^2 \left|F(\mathbf{g}) \right|^2.$$

The above assumes that the crystalline regions are somewhat large, for instance microns across, but also not so large that the X-rays are scattered more than once. If either of these is not the case then the diffracted intensities will be more complicated.

== X-ray sources ==
=== Rotating anode ===
Small scale diffraction experiments can be done with a local X-ray tube source, typically coupled with an image plate detector. These have the advantage of being relatively inexpensive and easy to maintain, and allow for quick screening and collection of samples. However, the wavelength of the X-rays produced is limited by the availability of different anode materials. Furthermore, the intensity is limited by the power applied and cooling capacity available to avoid melting the anode. In such systems, electrons are boiled off of a cathode and accelerated through a strong electric potential of ~50 kV; having reached a high speed, the electrons collide with a metal plate, emitting bremsstrahlung and some strong spectral lines corresponding to the excitation of inner-shell electrons of the metal. The most common metal used is copper, which can be kept cool easily due to its high thermal conductivity, and which produces strong K_{α} and K_{β} lines. The K_{β} line is sometimes suppressed with a thin (~10 μm) nickel foil. The simplest and cheapest variety of sealed X-ray tube has a stationary anode (the Crookes tube) and runs with ~2 kW of electron beam power. The more expensive variety has a rotating-anode type source that runs with ~14 kW of e-beam power.

X-rays are generally filtered (by use of X-ray filters) to a single wavelength (made monochromatic) and collimated to a single direction before they are allowed to strike the crystal. The filtering not only simplifies the data analysis, but also removes radiation that degrades the crystal without contributing useful information. Collimation is done either with a collimator (basically, a long tube) or with an arrangement of gently curved mirrors. Mirror systems are preferred for small crystals (under 0.3 mm) or with large unit cells (over 150 Å).

=== Microfocus tube ===
A more recent development is the microfocus tube, which can deliver at least as high a beam flux (after collimation) as rotating-anode sources but only require a beam power of a few tens or hundreds of watts rather than requiring several kilowatts.

=== Synchrotron radiation ===
Synchrotron radiation sources are some of the brightest light sources on earth and are some of the most powerful tools available for X-ray diffraction and crystallography. X-ray beams are generated in synchrotrons which accelerate electrically charged particles, often electrons, to nearly the speed of light and confine them in a (roughly) circular loop using magnetic fields.

Synchrotrons are generally national facilities, each with several dedicated beamlines where data is collected without interruption. Synchrotrons were originally designed for use by high-energy physicists studying subatomic particles and cosmic phenomena. The largest component of each synchrotron is its electron storage ring. This ring is not a perfect circle, but a many-sided polygon. At each corner of the polygon, or sector, precisely aligned magnets bend the electron stream. As the electrons' path is bent, they emit bursts of energy in the form of X-rays.

The intense ionizing radiation can cause radiation damage to samples, particularly macromolecular crystals. Cryo crystallography can protect the sample from radiation damage, by freezing the crystal at liquid nitrogen temperatures (~100 K). Cryocrystallography methods are applied to home source rotating anode sources as well. However, synchrotron radiation frequently has the advantage of user-selectable wavelengths, allowing for anomalous scattering experiments which maximizes anomalous signal. This is critical in experiments such as single wavelength anomalous dispersion (SAD) and multi-wavelength anomalous dispersion (MAD).

=== Free-electron laser ===
Free-electron lasers have been developed for use in X-ray diffraction and crystallography. These are the brightest X-ray sources currently available; with the X-rays coming in femtosecond bursts. The intensity of the source is such that atomic resolution diffraction patterns can be resolved for crystals otherwise too small for collection. However, the intense light source also destroys the sample, requiring multiple crystals to be shot. As each crystal is randomly oriented in the beam, hundreds of thousands of individual diffraction images must be collected in order to get a complete data set. This method, serial femtosecond crystallography, has been used in solving the structure of a number of protein crystal structures, sometimes noting differences with equivalent structures collected from synchrotron sources.

== Related scattering techniques ==
=== Other X-ray techniques ===
Other forms of elastic X-ray scattering besides single-crystal diffraction include powder diffraction, small-angle X-ray scattering (SAXS) and several types of X-ray fiber diffraction, which was used by Rosalind Franklin in determining the double-helix structure of DNA. In general, single-crystal X-ray diffraction offers more structural information than these other techniques; however, it requires a sufficiently large and regular crystal, which is not always available.

These scattering methods generally use monochromatic X-rays, which are restricted to a single wavelength with minor deviations. A broad spectrum of X-rays (that is, a blend of X-rays with different wavelengths) can also be used to carry out X-ray diffraction, a technique known as the Laue method. This is the method used in the original discovery of X-ray diffraction. Laue scattering provides much structural information with only a short exposure to the X-ray beam, and is therefore used in structural studies of very rapid events (time resolved crystallography). However, it is not as well-suited as monochromatic scattering for determining the full atomic structure of a crystal and therefore works better with crystals with relatively simple atomic arrangements.

The Laue back reflection mode records X-rays scattered backwards from a broad spectrum source. This is useful if the sample is too thick for X-rays to transmit through it. The diffracting planes in the crystal are determined by knowing that the normal to the diffracting plane bisects the angle between the incident beam and the diffracted beam. A Greninger chart can be used to interpret the back reflection Laue photograph.

=== Electron diffraction ===
Because they interact via the Coulomb forces the scattering of electrons by matter is 1000 or more times stronger than for X-rays. Hence electron beams produce strong multiple or dynamical scattering even for relatively thin crystals (>10 nm). While there are similarities between the diffraction of X-rays and electrons, as can be found in the book by John M. Cowley, the approach is different as it is based upon the original approach of Hans Bethe and solving Schrödinger equation for relativistic electrons, rather than a kinematical or Bragg's law approach. Information about very small regions, down to single atoms is possible. The range of applications for electron diffraction, transmission electron microscopy and transmission electron crystallography with high energy electrons is extensive; see the relevant links for more information and citations. In addition to transmission methods, low-energy electron diffraction is a technique where electrons are back-scattered off surfaces and has been extensively used to determine surface structures at the atomic scale, and reflection high-energy electron diffraction is another which is extensively used to monitor thin film growth.

=== Neutron diffraction ===
Neutron diffraction is used for structure determination, although it has been difficult to obtain intense, monochromatic beams of neutrons in sufficient quantities. Traditionally, nuclear reactors have been used, although sources producing neutrons by spallation are becoming increasingly available. Being uncharged, neutrons scatter more from the atomic nuclei rather than from the electrons. Therefore, neutron scattering is useful for observing the positions of light atoms with few electrons, especially hydrogen, which is essentially invisible in X-ray diffraction. Neutron scattering also has the property that the solvent can be made invisible by adjusting the ratio of normal water, H_{2}O, and heavy water, D_{2}O.
