= Homometric structures =

Type of crystal structures

In chemistry and crystallography, crystal structures that have the same set of interatomic distances are called homometric structures. Homometric structures need not be congruent (that is, related by a rigid motion or reflection). Homometric crystal structures produce identical diffraction patterns; therefore, they cannot be distinguished by a diffraction experiment.

Recently, a Monte Carlo algorithm was proposed to calculate the number of homometric structures corresponding to any given set of interatomic distances.

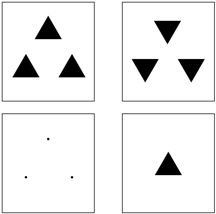
Example of two homometric structures (top) formed by the convolution between two non-centrosymmetric structures (bottom) with different orientations.

== See also ==
- Patterson function
- Arthur Lindo Patterson
