= MRC 0406−244 =

Radio galaxy producing an astrophysical jet in the constellation of Eridanus

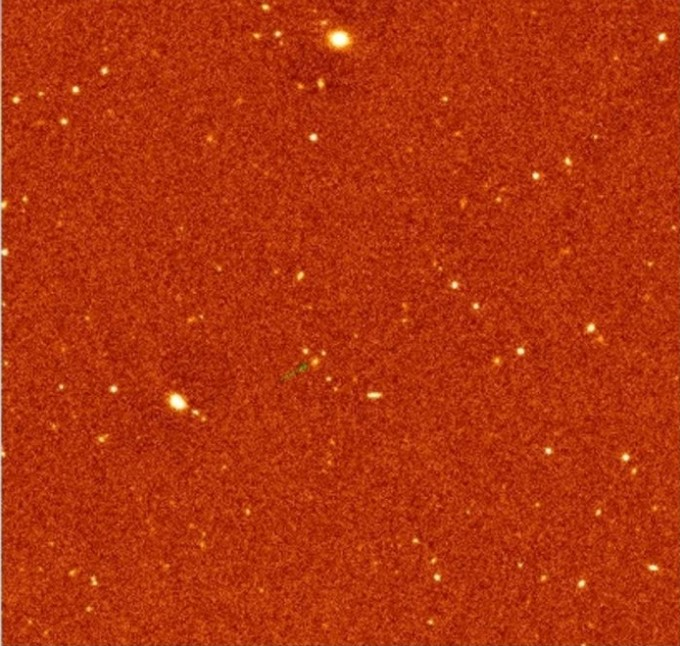
- MRC 0406−244, as seen by ESO

Observation data (J2000.0 epoch)
- Constellation: Eridanus
- Right ascension: 04^{h} 08^{m} 51.47^{s}
- Declination: −24° 18′ 16.47″
- Redshift: 2.440000
- Heliocentric radial velocity: 731,494 km/s
- Distance: 10.647 Gly (light travel time distance)
- Apparent magnitude (V): 0.144
- Apparent magnitude (B): 0.190
- Surface brightness: 22.4
- Notable features: Radio galaxy, seyfert galaxy, galaxy merger

Other designations
- TN J0408−2418, PMN J0408−2418, PGC 2823818, NVSS J040851−241815, TXS 0406−244, LQAC 062-024 001, GLEAM J040851−241817

MRC 0406−244 also known as TN J0408−2418, is a radio galaxy producing an astrophysical jet, located in the constellation of Eridanus. At its redshift of 2.44, it is roughly ten billion light years from Earth.

== Characteristics ==
MRC 0406−244 is one of the most powerful radio galaxies known date-to-date; it was studied extensively by the MRC/1 Jy radio source survey. MRC 0406−244 is also classified a Seyfert type 2 galaxy, with a complex morphology with multiple components; of which among them is a point source. Moreover, it contains an ultra-deep spectrum radio source (USS).

=== Host galaxy ===
The host galaxy of MRC 0406−244 is categorized as a large early-type galaxy with a dust obscured appearance and has a total star formation rate of 790 ± 75 M_{☉} per year. The galaxy also contains presence of a single stellar disc, described having an intact appearance.

=== Galaxy merger ===
Imaging made with Hubble Space Telescope (HST) have detected several several bright clumps being elongated along the axis of its radio jet. Further images also detected a presence of spatially resolved continuum being associated with the component in the southeast direction aligned along the direction of the radio axis, with a complex morphology, including a double nucleus and tidal tail features. This suggests of a tidal origin, meaning a recent galaxy merger has taken place. It is believed that galaxy mergers play a dominant role in fueling up its supermassive black hole. The black hole located inside the center of MRC 0406−244, is growing at an exponential rate of hundreds to thousands of solar masses per year, so as the luminosity, suggesting the radio galaxy is turning into a quasar.

== Observations ==
According from HST and ground-based multiwavelength observations of MRC 0406−244, two components are shown aligning together with its radio source. One of the components has characteristics of both red infrared optical and blue ultraviolet colors while the other component is completely reddened. The line emission based on lyman-alpha imaging is only about 3'' × 5'' extent, with most of the flux being situated away from the nucleus, towards the direction of southeast. Another component is also found extending towards the northwest direction with similar morphology detected through HST images. The total lyman-alpha flux is found to be 1.2 x 10^{−14} ergs per second per square centimetre. Ionized gas has been detected in the galaxy in form of a superbubble based on a 2009 observation.

== Radio Properties ==
A powerful triple radio source is detected in MRC 0406−244. This radio source has an estimated luminosity of 1.2×10^{36} ergs/s/Hz and radiating at 6.3×10^{45} ergs/s in the range between 100 MHz and 100 GHz frequencies. The source is also depicted as having a curved steep radio spectrum. Between 408 MHz and 8.44 GHz, the spectral index of the radio source is shown changing from 1.21 at 1 GHz to 1.49 at 16 GHz. The radio core has a spectral index of 0.80±0.18 and is the one contributing only 2% of the 15 GHz radio emission. The two radio lobes in MRC 0406−244 are notable for their degree of asymmetry in terms of arm length and spectral indices.
