= Alexander Robertson (chemist) =

British chemist

- Born: 12 February 1896; Charlesfield, Auchterless (on the Hatton Estate) Aberdeenshire
- Died: 9 February 1970 (aged 73)
- Education: M.A. (1919)
- Alma mater: University of Aberdeen and University of Glasgow
- Occupation: Chemist
- Awards: Davy Medal (1952)

Alexander Robertson FRS (12 February 1896 – 9 February 1970) was a British chemist. He was awarded the Davy Medal in 1952 "In recognition of his researches into the chemistry of natural products, particularly the wide range of glycosides, bitter principles and colouring matters containing heterocyclic oxygen atoms". He is known for his organic chemistry research, particularly in the investigation of natural products.

== Life ==
He grew up on a 63-acre Scottish farm and graduated from Turriff Higher Grade School in 1914. While he wanted to become a farmer, his family encouraged him to study science. He entered the University of Aberdeen in 1914 to study for a M.A.

During World War I, he served in the Special Brigade, Royal Engineers (1916) and in the 2nd Seaforth Highlanders (1917), achieving the rank of lieutenant before being discharged in 1918.

He performed doctoral research with G. G. Henderson at the University of Glasgow (1922–1924). His thesis was titled "Studies on the sabinene series of terpenes" and published in 1924. He was awarded a Ph.D. During this time, he also helped advise Henderson's other students, including John Monteath Robertson.

After completing his Ph.D., Robertson moved to the University of Manchester to work with Robert Robinson (chemist) on a Rockefeller International Science Fellowship (1924–1926). He also traveled to University of Graz to work with Fritz Pregl on microanalysis. He moved on to a position as Assistant Lecturer in Chemistry at University of Manchester in 1926, where he contributed to "synthetic work on anthocyanidin and anthocyanin pigments, identification of alkaloids of morphine and strychnine, and the Lapworth-Robinson electronic theory of organic reactions." He then moved to East London College (Queen Mary University of London) as a Reader in Chemistry (1928), and then as a Reader in Biochemistry at the London School of Hygiene and Tropical Medicine (1930).

In 1933 he became Professor and Health Harrison Chair in Organic Chemistry at University of Liverpool. He helped design new laboratory buildings and advocated for better facilities for students. He held a series of university posts, including Pro-Vice-Chancellor (1948–1953). Some of his notable trainees include Francis M. Dean, H. Gobind Khorana (1948), and William Basil Whalley (1952).

He married Margaret Mitchell-Chapman in 1926. In 1957 he retired from academic life and pursued farming until his death in 1970.
