= Flack parameter =

Factor in X-ray crystallography

In X-ray crystallography, the Flack parameter is a factor used to estimate the absolute configuration of a structural model determined by single-crystal structure analysis.

In this approach, one determines the absolute structure of a crystal in a Sohncke Space group. The processes used to decide the absolute structure use the anomalous dispersion effect. If atomic scattering factors did not have imaginary parts, the Friedel pairs would have exactly the same amplitudes (i.e., the scattering intensity $|F(h k l)|^{2}$ from crystal plane (h k l) is equal to $|F(-h -k -l)|^{2}$). However, atomic scattering factors have imaginary parts due to the anomalous dispersion effect, and Friedel's law is broken by this effect.

There are several ways to determine the absolute structure by X-ray crystallography. For example, a comparison of the intensities of Bijvoet pairs or of the R-factors for the two possible structures can suggest the correct absolute structure. One of the more powerful and simple approaches is using the Flack parameter, because this single parameter clearly indicates the absolute structure.

The Flack parameter is calculated during the structural refinement using the equation given below:

$\ I(hkl) = (1-x)|F(h k l)|^{2} + x|F(-h -k -l)|^{2}$

where x is the Flack parameter, I is the square of the scaled observed structure factor and F is the calculated structure factor.

By determining x for all data, x is usually found to be between 0 and 1. If the value is near 0, with a small standard uncertainty, the absolute structure given by the structure refinement is likely correct, and if the value is near 1, then the inverted structure is likely correct. If the value is near 0.5, the crystal may be racemic or twinned. The technique is most effective when the crystal contains both lighter and heavier atoms. Light atoms usually show only a small anomalous dispersion effect. In this case, the Flack parameter can refine to a physically unrealistic value (less than 0 or greater than 1) and has no meaning.

This parameter, introduced by H. D. Flack became one of a standard set of values being checked for structures with noncentrosymmetric space groups.
