= Single-wavelength anomalous diffraction =

Single-wavelength anomalous diffraction (SAD) is a technique used in X-ray crystallography that facilitates the determination of the structure of proteins or other biological macromolecules by allowing the solution of the phase problem. In contrast to multi-wavelength anomalous diffraction (MAD), SAD uses a single dataset at a single appropriate wavelength.

Compared to MAD, SAD has weaker phasing power and requires density modification to resolve phase ambiguity. This downside is not as important as SAD's main advantage: the minimization of time spent in the beam by the crystal, thus reducing potential radiation damage to the molecule while collecting data. SAD also allows a wider choice of heavy atoms and can be conducted without a synchrotron beamline. Today, selenium-SAD is commonly used for experimental phasing due to the development of methods for selenomethionine incorporation into recombinant proteins.

SAD is sometimes called "single-wavelength anomalous dispersion", but no dispersive differences are used in this technique since the data are collected at a single wavelength.

== See also ==
- Multi-wavelength anomalous dispersion (MAD)
- Multiple isomorphous replacement (MIR)
- Anomalous scattering
- Anomalous X-ray scattering
- Patterson map
