= Bond stretch isomer =

Proposed type of chemical isomerism based on bond length

In chemistry, bond stretch isomerism is a concept of isomerism based on variations of bond length. The concept was proposed in the 1970s but was refuted in the 1990s.

The phenomenon was first invoked to explain the observation of blue and green isomers of mer-MoOCl_{2}(PMe_{2}Ph)_{3}, where PMe_{2}Ph is dimethylphenylphosphine. These isomers were shown, purportedly, by X-ray crystallography to differ with respect to the length of the Mo-O bond, which differed by 0.2 Å. Subsequent work showed that the supposed green bond stretch isomer consisted of blue mer-MoOCl_{2}(PMe_{2}Ph)_{3} contaminated with a small amount of yellow mer-MoCl_{3}(PMe_{2}Ph)_{3}. The nearly isomorphous replacement of Mo-O unit with small amounts of Mo-Cl unit results in artifactually long Mo-O distance in the green sample. In essence the deception arises because the crystallographic disorder was not modeled appropriately. Several such examples were uncovered.

== Special examples ==
Bond stretch isomerism is confirmed for complexes subject to spin crossover transitions. In some octahedral complexes of d^{6} configuration, the depopulation of e_{g} orbitals causes significant contractions of the metal-ligand bond distances. The phenomenon is mainly manifested in the solid forms of the compounds.

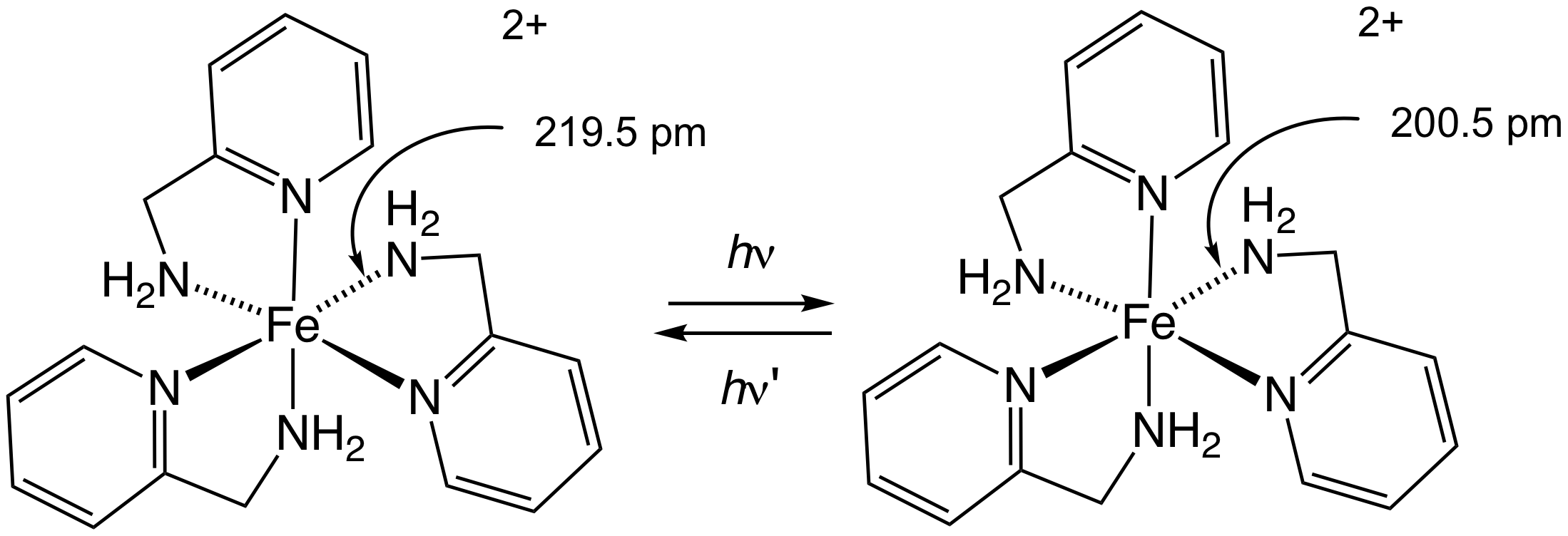
Light-induced spin-crossover of [Fe(pyCH_{2}NH_{2})_{3}]^{2+}, which switches from high and low-spin.

Although no example of bond stretch isomerism has been established in solution, two isomers have been crystallized for pentamethylcyclopentadienyl ruthenium dichloride dimer ([Cp*RuCl_{2}]_{2}). One has an Ru-Ru bond (2.93 Å) and the other has a long intermetallic distance of 3.75 Å. The former isomer is thought to be diamagnetic, and the latter is magnetic.
