= Peng Lianmao =

Chinese scientist and educator

- 彭练矛
- Born: September 1962 (age 63–64); Yingtan, Jiangxi, China
- Education: Peking University; Arizona State University
- Scientific career
- Fields: Nanomaterials
- Workplaces: School of Electronic Engineering and Computer Science, Peking University
- Doctoral advisor: John M. Cowley

Chinese name
- Traditional Chinese: 彭練矛
- Simplified Chinese: 彭练矛
Transcriptions
Standard Mandarin
- Hanyu Pinyin: Péng Liànmáo

Peng Lianmao (Chinese: 彭练矛; born September 1962) is a Chinese scientist and educator in the fields of nanomaterials.

== Education ==
Peng was born in Yingtan, Jiangxi, in September 1962, while his ancestral home in Pingjiang County, Hunan. He received his B.S. in physical electronics and master's degree from Peking University in 1982 and 1983, respectively. Then he enrolled at Arizona State University where he received his Ph.D. in physics under the direction of John M. Cowley in 1988. He carried out postdoctoral research at the University of Oslo (1988–1989) and University of Oxford (1989–1990).

== Career ==
In 1990 he was a research fellow at the Violette and Samuel Glasstone of the University of Oxford, he remained there until 1995. In 1995 he became a senior research scientist at the Institute of Physics, Chinese Academy of Sciences, he served for a total of 7 years. He joined the faculty of Peking University in April 1999, becoming the Yangzi Professor of Nanoscale Science and Technology in 1999, director of the Key Laboratory for the Physics and Chemistry of Nanodevices in 2004, head of the Department of Electronics in 2007, and director of the Centre for Carbon-based Nanoelectronics in 2015. In August 2018 he was hired as dean of the newly founded Hunan Institute of Advanced Sensing and Information Technology Innovation, Xiangtan University.

== Contributions ==
Peng led the team to develop a high-performance 5 nm (nanometer) gate length carbon nanotube CMOS device, which can work at three times the speed of Intel's most advanced 14 nm commercial silicon transistors, but the energy consumption is only 1/4 of that.

== Honours and awards ==
- 1990 International Federation of Societies for Microscopy (IFSEM) Presidential Scholar
- 1994 National Science Fund for Distinguished Young Scholars
- 1998 Qiu Shi Prize for Outstanding Young Scientist
- 1999 "Chang Jiang Scholar" (or " Yangtze River Scholar")
- 2000 Fellow of the Institute of Physics (IOP)
- 2003 Lee Hsun Lecture Award, Institute of Metal
- 2009 Lin Zhao Qian Award, Chinese Electron Microscopy Society
- 2010 State Natural Science Award (Second Class) for "Studies on the fundamentals of quantitative electron microscopy and nanostructured titanium oxide"
- 2011 Top 10 Science Advances, China
- 2016 2016 State National Science Award (Second Class) for project on "Electronic devices based on carbon-based nano materials"
- 2018 Science and Technology Award of the Ho Leung Ho Lee Foundation
- November 22, 2019 Member of the Chinese Academy of Sciences (CAS)
