= G. G. Henderson =

Scottish chemist (1862–1942)

- Born: 30 January 1862; Glasgow, Scotland
- Died: 28 September 1942 (aged 80)
- Education: University of Glasgow
- Occupation: Chemist

George Gerald Henderson (30 January 1862 – 28 September 1942) was a chemist and professor at the University of Glasgow. He was known for his work on terpenes.

== Life ==
Henderson was born to a Glasgow merchant in 1862. He entered the University of Glasgow, aged 15 to study natural sciences. He graduated wit a BSc with distinction in 1881. Next he studied the arts and obtained a second degree. In 1884, he studied organic chemistry as a research assistant with Johannes Wislicenus in Leipzig. In 1885, he was a research assistant with James Johnston Dobbie.

He obtained an MA in Natural Science with first class honors in 1884, and a DSc in 1890 from the University of Glasgow.

In 1884, Henderson started as an assistant to professor John Ferguson at the University of Glasgow. In 1889, he became a Lecturer on Chemistry at Queen Margaret College (Glasgow). In 1892, he became the Freeland Professor of Chemistry at Glasgow and West of Scotland Technical College, where he worked to develop the chemistry department into a world class institution. He became a Regius Professor of Chemistry at the University of Glasgow in 1919. During his tenure at University of Glasgow, he oversaw construction of new laboratories. In 1937, Henderson was awarded the Medal of the Society of Chemical Industry for "conspicuous service to applied chemistry". His research was influenced by Johannes Wislicenus, William Dittmar, George Thomas Beilby, and others.

In 1895, he married his cousin Agnes Mackenzie Kerr. They had no children. She died of a heart attack in 1937.

In his obituary, Henderson was described as:

"of full middle height, spare of form, with brown moustache which never altered its shape in obedience to the dictates of fashion. In fact, Henderson was one of the most unchangeable of men."

=== Notable students and trainees ===
- Ian (Isidore) Morris Heilbron (research assistant, 1907)
- Alexander Robertson (graduate student, 1924, Studies on the sabinene series of terpenes)
- Alexander R. Todd (student)
- John Monteath Robertson (graduate student, 1926, The structural relationships of certain members of the bicyclic sesquiterpene series)

=== Service and affiliations ===
- President, Chemical Society (1931-1933)
- President, the Institute of Chemistry (1924-1927)
- President, the Society of Chemical Industry (1914-1915)
- Secretary, Recorder, and President, Section B (Chemistry) of the British Association
- Fellow, Royal Society (1916)
