= Multi-wavelength anomalous diffraction =

Multi-wavelength anomalous diffraction (sometimes Multi-wavelength anomalous dispersion; abbreviated MAD) is a technique used in X-ray crystallography that facilitates the determination of the three-dimensional structure of biological macromolecules (e.g. DNA, drug receptors) via solution of the phase problem.

MAD was developed by Wayne Hendrickson while working as a postdoctoral researcher under Jerome Karle at the United States Naval Research Laboratory. The mathematics upon which MAD (and progenitor Single-wavelength anomalous diffraction) was based were developed by Jerome Karle, work for which he was awarded the 1985 Nobel Prize in Chemistry (along with Herbert Hauptman).

Compared to the predecessor SAD, MAD has greatly elevated phasing power from using multiple wavelengths close to the edge. However, because it requires a synchrotron beamline, a longer exposure (risking radiation damage), and only allows a limited choice of heavy atoms (those with edges reachable by a synchrotron), MAD has declined in popularity relative to SAD.

== See also ==
- Single wavelength anomalous dispersion (SAD)
- Multiple isomorphous replacement (MIR)
- Anomalous scattering
- Anomalous X-ray scattering
- Patterson map
