= Le Bail method =

Le Bail analysis is a whole diffraction pattern profile fitting technique used to characterize the properties of crystalline materials, such as structure. It was invented by Armel Le Bail around 1988.

== Background ==
The Le Bail method extracts intensities (I_{hkl}) from powder diffraction data. This is done in order to find intensities that are suitable to determine the atomic structure of a crystalline material and to refine the unit cell and has the added advantage of checking phase-purity. Generally, the intensities of powder diffraction data are complicated by overlapping diffraction peaks with similar d-spacings. For the Le Bail method, the unit cell and the approximate space group of the sample must be predetermined because they are included as a part of the fitting technique. The algorithm involves refining the unit cell, the profile parameters, and the peak intensities to match the measured powder diffraction pattern. It is not necessary to know the structural factor and associated structural parameters, since they are not considered in this type of analysis. Le Bail can be used to find phase transitions in high pressure and temperature experiments. It generally provides a quick method to refine the unit cell, which allows better experimental planning. Le Bail analysis provides a more reliable estimate for the intensities of allowed reflections for different crystal symmetries.

Crystallographic structural determination can be accomplished in multiple ways. Le Bail technique is relevant for diffraction studies that involve using a radiation source, which may be neutron or synchrotron, to collect a high resolution, high quality powder diffraction profile. Initially, peak positions are found in the data. Next, the pattern is indexed in order to determine the unit cell or lattice parameters. Then, space group determination follows based on symmetry and the presence or absence of certain reflections. Then, either Le Bail or Pawley technique may be used to extract intensities and refine the unit cell.

== Refinement ==
Le Bail analysis fits parameters using a steepest descent minimization process. Specifically, the method is least squares analysis, which is an iterative process that is discussed later in this article. The parameters being fitted include the unit-cell parameters, the instrumental zero error, peak width parameters, and peak shape parameters. First, the Le Bail method defines an arbitrary starting value for the intensities (I_{obs}). This value is ordinarily set to one, but other values may be used. While peak positions are constrained by the unit cell parameters, intensities are unconstrained. The equation to calculate intensities is:

$I_{obs}(1) = \frac{ \sum y_i(obs) y_i(1)}{y_i(calc)}$

In the equation, I_{obs} is the intensity observed at a particular step and y_{i}(obs) is the observed profile point. y_{i}(calc) is the A single intensity value may contain more than one peak. Other peaks may be calculated similarly. The final intensity for a peak is calculated as y(calc) = y_{i}(1) + y_{i}(2). The summation is carried out over all contributing profile points for a particular 2-theta bin. The summation process is known as profile intensity partitioning, and it works over any number of peaks. Le Bail technique works especially well with overlapping intensities since in this method the intensity is allotted based on the multiplicity of the intensities that contribute to a particular peak.

The somewhat arbitrary choice of starting values produces a bias in the calculated values. The refinement process continues by setting the new calculated structure factor to the observed structure factor value. The process is then repeated with the new structure factor estimate. At this point, the unit cell, background, peak widths, peak shape, and resolution function are refined, and the parameters are improved. The structure factor is then reset to the new structure factor value, and the process begins again. Structural refinement can continue with whole profile fitting techniques or further treatment of peak overlap. Probabilistic approaches may also be used to treat peak overlap.

== Advantages ==
Some authors suggest the Le Bail technique exploits prior information more efficiently than Pawley method. This was an important consideration at the time of development when computing power was limited. Le Bail is also easily integrated into Rietveld analysis software, and is a part of a number of programs. Both methods improve subsequent structural refinements.

== Available software ==
Le Bail analysis is commonly a part of Rietveld analysis software, such as GSAS/EXPGUI. It is also used in ARITVE, BGMN, EXPO, EXTRACT, FullProf, GENEFP, Jana2006, Overlap, Powder Cell, Rietan, TOPAS and Highscore.

== Sources ==
- Dinnebier, R. (2008), Dinnebier, R E; Billinge, S J L (eds.), Powder Diffraction: Theory and Practice (1st ed.), RSC, p. 200, doi:10.1039/9781847558237, ISBN 978-0-85404-231-9
- LeBail, A (2005). "Whole Powder Pattern Decomposition Methods and Applications: A Retrospection". Powder Diffraction. 20 (4): 316–326. Bibcode:2005PDiff..20..316L. doi:10.1154/1.2135315.
- Department of Chemistry, University College, London, Powder Diffraction on the Web
