= John M. Cowley =

Australian physicist (1923–2004)

John Cowley
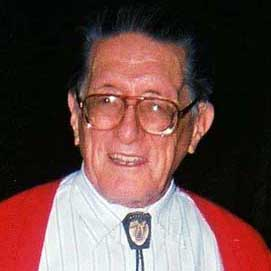
- Born: John Maxwell Cowley; February 18, 1923
- Died: May 18, 2004 (aged 81)
- Education: University of Adelaide; MIT
- Awards: ForMemRS; FAA
- Scientific career
- Fields: Physics
- Workplaces: Arizona State University; University of Melbourne
- Doctoral advisor: Bertram Eugene Warren
- Doctoral students: Zhong Lin Wang; Peng Lianmao

John Maxwell Cowley (18 February 1923 – 18 May 2004) was an American Regents Professor at Arizona State University. The John M. Cowley Center for High-Resolution Electron Microscopy at Arizona State is named in his honor.

John Cowley was an extraordinarily productive scientist over more than five decades. He made pioneering contributions in the fields of electron microscopy, diffraction and crystallography, all of which brought him widespread recognition. He received the highest awards of the International Union of Crystallography (first Ewald Prize), the Electron Microscopy Society of America and the American Crystallographic Society, and he was honored by election to Fellowship of the Australian Academy of Science, The Royal Society of London, and the American Physical Society. His monograph Diffraction Physics remains the standard reference in the field. His ideas, enthusiasm and basic understanding of electron optics and diffraction phenomena provided a valued source of leadership to many generations of students and co-workers, and he was universally admired by his peers and colleagues as a great and inspiring scientist.

== Selected publications ==
- Cowley, J. M. (1995). Diffraction physics. North Holland personal library (3rd ed.). Amsterdam: Elsevier. ISBN 978-0-444-82218-5.
- Cowley, J. M. (1950). "X-Ray Measurement of Order in Single Crystals of Cu3Au". Journal of Applied Physics. 21 (1): 24–30. doi:10.1063/1.1699415. ISSN 0021-8979.
- Cowley, J. M. (1950). "An Approximate Theory of Order in Alloys". Physical Review. 77 (5): 669–675. Bibcode:1950PhRv...77..669C. doi:10.1103/PhysRev.77.669. ISSN 0031-899X.
- Cowley, J. M.; Moodie, A. F. (1957). "The scattering of electrons by atoms and crystals. I. A new theoretical approach". Acta Crystallographica. 10 (10): 609–619. Bibcode:1957AcCry..10..609C. doi:10.1107/S0365110X57002194. ISSN 0365-110X.
- Cowley, J. M. (1969). "Image contrast in a transmission scanning electron microscope". Applied Physics Letters. 15 (2): 58–59. Bibcode:1969ApPhL..15...58C. doi:10.1063/1.1652901. ISSN 0003-6951.
- Cowley, J. M.; Iijima, Sumio (1972). "Electron Microscope Image Contrast for Thin Crystal". Zeitschrift für Naturforschung A. 27 (3): 445–451. Bibcode:1972ZNatA..27..445C. doi:10.1515/zna-1972-0312. ISSN 1865-7109.
- Cowley, J. M. (1986). "Electron diffraction phenomena observed with a high resolution STEM instrument". Journal of Electron Microscopy Technique. 3 (1): 25–44. doi:10.1002/jemt.1060030105. ISSN 0741-0581.
- Cowley, J.M. (1992). "Twenty forms of electron holography". Ultramicroscopy. 41 (4): 335–348. doi:10.1016/0304-3991(92)90213-4.
