= Anomalous X-ray scattering =

Anomalous X-ray scattering (AXRS or XRAS) is a non-destructive determination technique within X-ray diffraction that makes use of the anomalous dispersion that occurs when a wavelength is selected that is in the vicinity of an absorption edge of one of the constituent elements of the sample. It is used in materials research to study nanometer sized differences in structure.

== Atomic scattering factors ==
In X-ray diffraction the scattering factor f for an atom is roughly proportional to the number of electrons that it possesses. However, for wavelengths that approximate those for which the atom strongly absorbs radiation the scattering factor undergoes a change due to anomalous dispersion. The dispersion not only affects the magnitude of the factor but also imparts a phase shift in the elastic collision of the photon. The scattering factor can therefore best be described as a complex number:

f = f_{o} + Δf' + iΔf"

== Contrast variation ==
The anomalous aspects of X-ray scattering have become the focus of considerable interest in the scientific community because of the availability of synchrotron radiation. In contrast to desktop X-ray sources that only operate at certain fixed wavelengths, synchrotron radiation is generated by accelerating electrons and using an undulator (device of periodic placed dipole magnets) to "wiggle" the electrons in their path, to generate a desired wavelength of X-rays. This allows scientists to vary the wavelength, which in turn makes it possible to vary the scattering factor for one particular element in the sample under investigation. Thus, a particular element can be highlighted in a process known as contrast variation. In addition to this effect the anomalous scattering is more sensitive to any deviation from sphericity of the electron cloud around the atom. This can lead to resonant effects involving transitions in the outer shell of the atom: resonant anomalous X-ray scattering.

== Protein crystallography ==
In protein crystallography, anomalous scattering refers to a change in a diffracting X-ray's phase that is unique from the rest of the atoms in a crystal due to strong X-ray absorbance. The amount of energy that individual atoms absorb depends on their atomic number. The relatively light atoms found in proteins such as carbon, nitrogen, and oxygen do not contribute to anomalous scattering at normal X-ray wavelengths used for X-ray crystallography. Thus, in order to observe anomalous scattering, a heavy atom must be native to the protein or a heavy atom derivative should be made. In addition, the X-ray's wavelength should be close to the heavy atom's absorption edge.

== List of methods ==
- Multi-wavelength anomalous diffraction (MAD)
- Single-wavelength anomalous diffraction (SAD)
- Diffraction anomalous fine structure (DAFS) combines the use of anomalous diffraction with X-ray absorption fine structure (XAFS).
