= Bertram Eugene Warren =

American crystallographer (1902–1991)

- Born: June 28, 1902; Waltham, Massachusetts, U.S.
- Died: June 27, 1991 (aged 88); Arlington, Massachusetts, U.S.
- Education: Massachusetts Institute of Technology
- Scientific career
- Fields: Crystallography
- Workplaces: Massachusetts Institute of Technology
- Doctoral advisor: William Henry Bragg
- Doctoral students: John M. Cowley

Bertram Eugene Warren (June 28, 1902 – June 27, 1991) was an American crystallographer. His studies of X-rays provided much knowledge and understanding of both crystalline and non-crystalline materials. He also worked on changing amorphous solids to a crystalline state.
