= Phase problem =

Issue in determining wave cycle part

In physics, the phase problem is the problem of loss of information concerning the phase that can occur when making a physical measurement. The name comes from the field of X-ray crystallography, where the phase problem has to be solved for the determination of a structure from diffraction data. The phase problem is also met in the fields of imaging and signal processing. Various approaches of phase retrieval have been developed over the years.

== Overview ==
Light detectors, such as photographic plates or CCDs, measure only the intensity of the light that hits them. This measurement is incomplete (even when neglecting other degrees of freedom such as polarization and angle of incidence) because a light wave has not only an amplitude (related to the intensity), but also a phase (related to the direction), and polarization which are systematically lost in a measurement. In diffraction or microscopy experiments, the phase part of the wave often contains valuable information on the studied specimen. The phase problem constitutes a fundamental limitation ultimately related to the nature of measurement in quantum mechanics.

In X-ray crystallography, the diffraction data when properly assembled gives the amplitude of the 3D Fourier transform of the molecule's electron density in the unit cell. If the phases are known, the electron density can be simply obtained by Fourier synthesis. This Fourier transform relation also holds for two-dimensional far-field diffraction patterns (also called Fraunhofer diffraction) giving rise to a similar type of phase problem.

== Phase retrieval ==
There are several ways to retrieve the lost phases. The phase problem must be solved in X-ray crystallography, neutron crystallography, and electron crystallography.

Not all of the methods of phase retrieval work with every wavelength (X-ray, neutron, and electron) used in crystallography.

=== Direct (ab initio) methods ===
If the crystal diffracts to high resolution (<1.2 Å), the initial phases can be estimated using direct methods. Direct methods can be used in X-ray crystallography, neutron crystallography, and electron crystallography.

A number of initial phases are tested and selected by this method. The other is the Patterson method, which directly determines the positions of heavy atoms. The Patterson function gives a large value in a position which corresponds to interatomic vectors. This method can be applied only when the crystal contains heavy atoms or when a significant fraction of the structure is already known.

For molecules whose crystals provide reflections in the sub-Ångström range, it is possible to determine phases by brute force methods, testing a series of phase values until spherical structures are observed in the resultant electron density map. This works because atoms have a characteristic structure when viewed in the sub-Ångström range. The technique is limited by processing power and data quality. For practical purposes, it is limited to "small molecules" and peptides because they consistently provide high-quality diffraction with very few reflections.

=== Molecular replacement (MR) ===
Phases can also be inferred by using a process called molecular replacement, where a similar molecule's already-known phases are grafted onto the intensities of the molecule at hand, which are observationally determined. These phases can be obtained experimentally from a homologous molecule or if the phases are known for the same molecule but in a different crystal, by simulating the molecule's packing in the crystal and obtaining theoretical phases. Generally, these techniques are less desirable since they can severely bias the solution of the structure. They are useful, however, for ligand binding studies, or between molecules with small differences and relatively rigid structures (for example derivatizing a small molecule).

=== Isomorphous replacement ===
==== Multiple isomorphous replacement (MIR) ====
Multiple isomorphous replacement (MIR), where heavy atoms are inserted into structure (usually by synthesizing proteins with analogs or by soaking)

=== Anomalous scattering ===
==== Multi-wavelength anomalous dispersion (MAD) ====
A powerful solution is the multi-wavelength anomalous dispersion (MAD) method. In this technique, atoms' inner electrons (K-shell) absorb X-rays of particular wavelengths, and reemit the X-rays after a delay, inducing a phase shift in all of the reflections, known as the anomalous dispersion effect. Analysis of this phase shift (which may be different for individual reflections) results in a solution for the phases. Since X-ray fluorescence techniques (like this one) require excitation at very specific wavelengths, it is necessary to use synchrotron radiation when using the MAD method.

== Phase improvement ==
=== Refining initial phases ===
In many cases, an initial set of phases are determined, and the electron density map for the diffraction pattern is calculated. Then the map is used to determine portions of the structure, which portions are used to simulate a new set of phases. This new set of phases is known as a refinement. These phases are reapplied to the original amplitudes, and an improved electron density map is derived, from which the structure is corrected. This process is repeated until an error term (usually $R_\textrm{free}$) has stabilized to a satisfactory value. Because of the phenomenon of phase bias, it is possible for an incorrect initial assignment to propagate through successive refinements, so satisfactory conditions for a structure assignment are still a matter of debate. Indeed, some spectacular incorrect assignments have been reported, including a protein where the entire sequence was threaded backwards.

== See also ==
- Coherent diffraction imaging
- Ptychography
- Phase retrieval
