= Patterson function =

The Patterson function is used to solve the phase problem in X-ray crystallography. It was introduced in 1935 by Arthur Lindo Patterson while he was a visiting researcher in the laboratory of Bertram Eugene Warren at MIT.

The Patterson function is defined as

$$P(u,v,w) = \sum_{h, k, \ell\in\mathbb Z} \left|F_{h, k, \ell}\right|^2 \;e^{-2\pi i(hu + kv + \ell w)}.$$

It is essentially the Fourier transform of the intensities rather than the structure factors. The Patterson function is also equivalent to the electron density convolved with its inverse:

$$P\left(\vec{u}\right) = \rho\left(\vec{r}\right) * \rho\left(-\vec{r}\right).$$

Furthermore, a Patterson map of N points will have N(N − 1) peaks, excluding the central (origin) peak and any overlap.

The peaks' positions in the Patterson function are the interatomic distance vectors and the peak heights are proportional to the product of the number of electrons in the atoms concerned.

Because for each vector between atoms i and j there is an oppositely oriented vector of the same length (between atoms j and i), the Patterson function always has centrosymmetry.

== One-dimensional example ==
Consider the series of delta functions given by

$$f(x) = \delta(x) + 3 \delta(x-2) + \delta(x-5) + 3 \delta(x-8) + 5 \delta(x-10). \,$$

The Patterson function is given by the following series of delta functions and unit step functions

$$\begin{align} P(u) = {} &5 \delta(u+10) + 18 \delta(u+8) + 9 \delta(u+6) + 6 \delta(u+5) + 6 \delta(u+3) \\
& + 18 \delta(u+2) + 45 \delta(u) + 18 \delta(u-2) + 6 \delta(u-3) + 6 \delta(u-5) \\
& + 9 \delta(u-6) + 18 \delta(u-8) + 5 \delta(u-10). \end{align}$$
