= Acta Crystallographica =

Scientific journal series on crystallography

Acta Crystallographica is a series of peer-reviewed scientific journals, with articles centred on crystallography, published by the International Union of Crystallography (IUCr). Originally established in 1948 as a single journal called Acta Crystallographica, there are now six independent Acta Crystallographica titles:

- Acta Crystallographica Section A: Foundations and Advances
- Acta Crystallographica Section B: Structural Science, Crystal Engineering and Materials
- Acta Crystallographica Section C: Structural Chemistry
- Acta Crystallographica Section D: Structural Biology
- Acta Crystallographica Section E: Crystallographic Communications
- Acta Crystallographica Section F: Structural Biology Communications

Acta Crystallographica has been noted for the high quality of the papers that it produces, as well as the large impact that its papers have had on the field of crystallography. The current six journals form part of the journal portfolio of the IUCr, which is completed by the Journal of Applied Crystallography, the Journal of Synchrotron Radiation, the open-access IUCrJ and the open-access data publication IUCr Data.

== History ==
Acta Crystallographica was established in conjunction with the foundation of the International Union of Crystallography in 1948. Both were established to maintain an international forum for crystallography after the Second World War had led to a loss of international subscription to, and the eventual nine-year closure of, the main pre-war crystallography journal, Zeitschrift für Kristallographie. The founding editor of Acta Crystallographica was P. P. Ewald, who wrote in the preface to the first issue

Acta Crystallographica is intended to offer a central place for publication and discussion of all research in this vast and ever-expanding field. It borders, naturally, on pure physics, chemistry, biology, mineralogy, technology and also on mathematics, but is distinguished by being concerned with the methods and results of investigating the arrangement of atoms in matter, particularly when that arrangement has regular features.

— P. P. Ewald, Acta Crystallographica, 1, 1 (1948)

A steady increase in the number of submitted papers led to the journal being split into Section A, covering fundamental and theoretical studies, and Section B, dedicated to reports of structures, in 1968, together with a new journal, the Journal of Applied Crystallography. In 1983, Section C, devoted to the crystal structures of small molecules, was added, with Section B now focusing on biological, chemical, mineralogical and metallurgical crystallography. The rapid expansion in biological crystallography led to the launch of Section D in 1993. The journals launched online versions in 1999, and in 2000 the journals began to provide electronic article submission and subscription access online. This was followed by the launch of an online-only journal, Section E, for brief reports of new small-molecule structures, in 2001; this journal became fully open access in 2008. A second online-only journal, Section F, dedicated to short reports of macromolecular structures and reports on their crystallization, followed in 2005. The IUCr moved to online-only publication for all its journals from 2014.
