= Crystallography Open Database =

Database of crystal structures

Crystallography Open Database (COD)

Content
- Description: Crystal structures and platform for world-wide collaboration

Contact
- Research center: Vilnius University
- Authors: Saulius Gražulis
- Primary citation: Gražulis & al. (2012)
- Release date: 2003

Access
- Data format: Crystallographic Information File (.cif)
- Website: https://www.crystallography.net
- Public SQL access: https://wiki.crystallography.net/howtoquerycod/

The Crystallography Open Database (COD) is a database of crystal structures. Unlike similar crystallographic databases, the database is entirely open-access, with registered users able to contribute published and unpublished structures of small molecules and small to medium-sized unit cell crystals to the database. As of November 2024, the database has more than 520,000 entries. The database has various contributors, and contains Crystallographic Information Files as defined by the International Union of Crystallography (IUCr). There are currently five sites worldwide that mirror this database. The 3D structures of compounds can be converted to input files for 3D printers.

== See also ==
- Crystallography
- Crystallographic database
- Theoretical Crystallography Open Database (TCOD), an open-access collection of theoretically calculated or refined crystal structures of organic, inorganic, metal-organic compounds and minerals, excluding biopolymers.
- Cambridge Structural Database (CSD) maintained by the Cambridge Crystallographic Data Centre (CCDC)
- Inorganic Crystal Structure Database (ICSD)
