= Mercury (crystallography) =

Mercury (Crystal Structure Visualisation, Exploration and Analysis software)
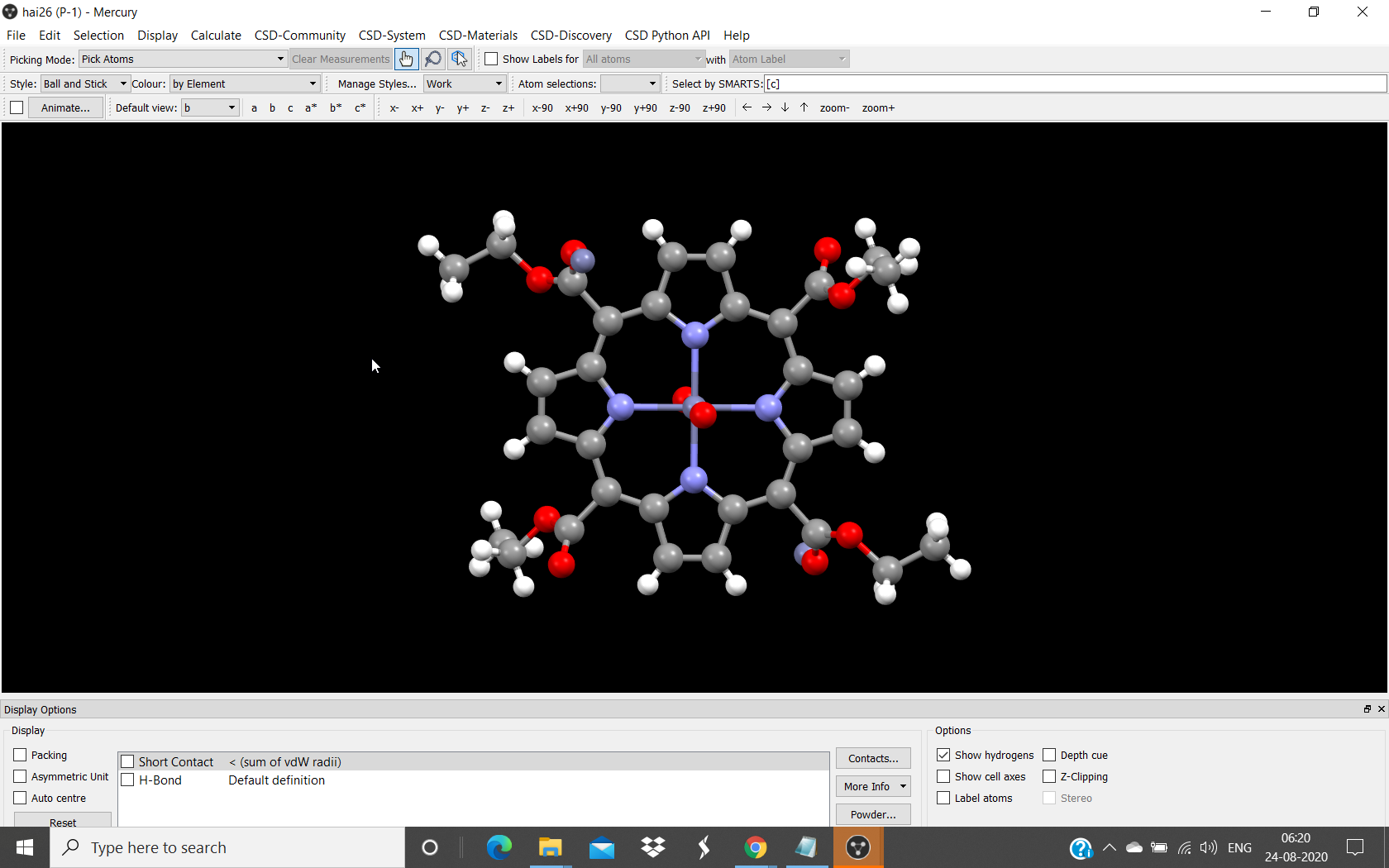
- Mercury 4. 2. 0. screenshot
- Original author(s): F. H. Allen
- Developer(s): Cambridge Crystallographic Data Centre
- Initial release: 2001; 24 years ago
- Stable release: Mercury 4.2.0 / 2019; 6 years ago
- Preview release: Mercury 4.2.0
- Operating system: Windows, Linux 64-bit, MacOS
- License: Free download software
- Website: www.ccdc.cam.ac.uk/Community/csd-community/freemercury/

Mercury is a freeware developed by the Cambridge Crystallographic Data Centre, originally designed as a crystal structure visualization tool. Mercury helps three dimensional visualization of crystal structure and assists in drawing and analysis of crystal packing and intermolecular interactions. Current version Mercury can read "cif", ".mol", ".mol2", ".pdb", ".res", ".sd" and ".xyz" types of files. Mercury has its own file format with filename extension ".mryx".

== History ==
The Cambridge Crystallographic Data Centre (CCDC) developed and launched two programs, named ConQuest and Mercury that run under Windows and various types of Unix, including Linux. ConQuest as a search interface to the Cambridge Structural Database (CSD), with Fortran code that performs a large variety of tasks, such as two dimensional and three-dimensional substructure searching. Mercury introduced as a crystal structure visualizer having the facilities for exploring the intermolecular contacts. The mercury program entirely written in object oriented C++. The C++ Qt library is used for building the GUI and OpenGL for three-dimensional graphics rendering. The primary objective of the first generation Mercury is to provide the three dimensional viewing of crystal structures with .MOL2, .PDB, .CIF, .MOL file formats. The first version have approximately 2800 users signed on to the Mercury e-mail announcement list. Mercury 2.0 launched in 2008, with additional tools to interpret and compare packing trends in crystal structures. Mercury version released in 2015 and later provides an additional functionality to generate 3D print. The current Version 4.0 of Mercury developed its visual interface up to a greater extent by comparing with its old versions.

== Licence ==
Mercury is available as a free download software and full version Mercury with more advanced features available with a CSD licence, advanced features are disabled in the absence of such a licence. Cambridge Crystallographic Data Centre (CCDC) provides CSD licence to academic institutions.

== See also ==
- Cambridge Crystallographic Data Centre
- Crystallographic Information File
- International Union of Crystallography
- Protein Data Bank (file format)
- CrystalExplorer
