= Acta Crystallographica Section A =

- Discipline: Crystallography
- Language: English
- Edited by: A. Altomare; S. J. L. Billinge

Publication details
- Former names: Acta Crystallographica Section A: Crystal Physics, Diffraction, Theoretical and General Crystallography; Acta Crystallographica Section A: Foundations of Crystallography
- History: 1968-present
- Publisher: IUCr/Wiley
- Frequency: Bimonthly
- Open access: Hybrid
- Impact factor: 1.9 (2023)

Standard abbreviations
- ISO 4: Acta Crystallogr. A

Indexing
- CODEN: ACSAD7
- ISSN: 2053-2733

Links
- Journal homepage

Acta Crystallographica Section A: Foundations and Advances is a peer-reviewed structural science journal published bimonthly by the International Union of Crystallography. It contains papers describing fundamental developments in structural science. It was founded in 1967 when Acta Crystallographica was split into two sections and was initially titled Acta Crystallographica Section A: Crystal Physics, Diffraction, Theoretical and General Crystallography. The journal's name changed in 1982 to Acta Crystallographica Section A: Foundations of Crystallography. The journal adopted its current title in 2013.

== Abstracting and indexing ==
The journal is abstracted and indexed in Biological Abstracts, the Cambridge Structural Database, Ceramic Abstracts, Chemical Abstracts, Crossref, the Current Chemical Reactions Database, Google Scholar, the Inorganic Crystal Structure Database, INSPEC, Medline, Metals Abstracts/METADEX, PubMed Central, the Reaction Citation Index, the Science Citation Index, the Science Citation Index Expanded, SCISEARCH and Scopus.

According to the Journal Citation Reports, the journal has a 2023 impact factor of 1.9, ranking it 15th out of 33 journals in the category "Crystallography".

The journal attracted attention when its impact factor reached 49.9 in 2009 after the publication of an article on the SHELX crystallographic software by George M. Sheldrick. This led to a debate on the usefulness of such metrics.
