= Chemical Database Service =

The Chemical Database Service is an EPSRC-funded mid-range facility that provides UK academic institutions with access to a number of chemical databases. It has been hosted by the Royal Society of Chemistry since 2013, before which it was hosted by Daresbury Laboratory (part of the Science and Technology Facilities Council).

Currently, the included databases are:

- ACD/I-Lab, a tool for prediction of physicochemical properties and NMR spectra from a chemical structure
- Available Chemicals Directory, a structure-searchable database of commercially available chemicals
- Cambridge Structural Database (CSD), a crystallographic database of organic and organometallic structures
- Inorganic Crystal Structure Database (ICSD), a crystallographic database of inorganic structures
- CrystalWorks, a database combining data from CSD, ICSD and CrystMet
- DETHERM, a database of thermophysical data for chemical compounds and mixtures
- SPRESIweb, a database of organic compounds and reactions
