= Acta Crystallographica Section D =

- Discipline: Crystallography; Biochemistry
- Language: English
- Edited by: E. Garman; R. J. Read; C. S. Bond

Publication details
- Former name: Acta Crystallographica Section D: Biological Crystallography
- History: 1993–present
- Publisher: IUCr/Wiley
- Frequency: Monthly
- Open access: Hybrid
- Impact factor: 7.652 (2020)

Standard abbreviations
- ISO 4: Acta Crystallogr. D

Indexing
- CODEN: ACSDAD
- ISSN: 2059-7983

Links
- Journal homepage

Acta Crystallographica Section D: Structural Biology publishes articles covering all areas of structural biology, including biomolecular structures determined by NMR and cryo-EM as well as crystallography, and the methods used to obtain them. The journal was launched in 1993 as Acta Crystallographica Section D: Biological Crystallography with Jenny Glusker as the founding Editor. In 2003, Ted Baker and Zbigniew Dauter took over the editorship of the journal.

The current editors are Elspeth Garman, Randy J. Read and Charles S. Bond. In 2016, the title was changed to Acta Crystallographica Section D: Structural Biology to reflect the expanded scope of the journal.

== Abstracting and indexing ==
The journal is abstracted and indexed in:

- Biochemistry and Biophysics Citation Index
- Biological Abstracts
- BIOSIS Previews
- Cambridge Structural Database
- Ceramic Abstracts
- Chemical Abstracts Service
- Chemistry Citation Index
- Current Contents/ Life Sciences
- Inorganic Crystal Structure Database
- Inspec
- Medline
- Metals Abstracts/METADEX
- Nucleic Acid Database
- Protein Data Bank
- Research Alert
- Science Citation Index
- Science Citation Index Expanded
- SCISEARCH
- Scopus
