= Acta Crystallographica Section B =

- Discipline: Crystallography
- Language: English
- Edited by: A. J. Blake; M. de Boissieu; A. Nangia

Publication details
- Former names: Acta Crystallographica. Section B: Structural Crystallography and Crystal Chemistry; Acta Crystallographica Section B: Structural Science
- History: 1968-present
- Publisher: IUCr/Wiley
- Frequency: Bimonthly
- Open access: Hybrid
- Impact factor: 2.266 (2020)

Standard abbreviations
- ISO 4: Acta Crystallogr. B

Indexing
- CODEN: ACSBDA
- ISSN: 2052-5206

Links
- Journal homepage

Acta Crystallographica Section B: Structural Science, Crystal Engineering and Materials publishes scientific articles on structural science. According to the journal: "Knowledge of the arrangements of atoms, including their temporal variations and dependencies on temperature and pressure, is often the key to understanding physical and chemical phenomena and is crucial for the design of new materials and supramolecular devices." It was formed in 1968 when the journal Acta Crystallographica was split into two parts and has been published for the International Union of Crystallography under the following titles:

- Acta Crystallographica. Section B: Structural Crystallography and Crystal Chemistry (ISSN 0567-7408) from its formation until the end of 1982. It was published in Denmark by Munksgaard and accepted articles in English, French, and German.
- On the launch of Acta Crystallographica Section C in 1983, the title of Section B changed to Acta Crystallographica Section B: Structural Science (ISSN 0108-7681), and the publisher was changed to Wiley-Blackwell in 2004 after Wiley had acquired Munksgaard.
- From the start of 2013, the title was changed to the present Acta Crystallographica Section B: Structural Science, Crystal Engineering and Materials (ISSN 2052-5192) and the journal now only publishes in English.

== Abstracting and indexing ==
The journal is abstracted and indexed in:

- Biological Abstracts
- Cambridge Structural Database
- Ceramic Abstracts
- Chemical Abstracts Service
- Chemistry Citation Index
- Current Chemical Reactions Database
- Current Contents/ Physical, Chemical and Earth Sciences
- Inorganic Crystal Structure Database
- Inspec
- ISI Chemistry Reaction Center
- Medline
- Metals Abstracts/METADEX
- Materials Science Citation Index
- Nucleic Acid Database
- Protein Data Bank
- Reaction Citation Index
- Research Alert
- Science Citation Index
- Science Citation Index Expanded
- SCISEARCH
- Scopus
