= Frank Allen (chemist) =

English crystallographer (1944–2014)

Frank H Allen
- Born: Frank Harmsworth Allen; June 1944; Reading
- Died: 10 November 2014 (aged 70)
- Resting place: Histon and Impington Cemetery
- Education: Imperial College London
- Known for: Innovative data handling at CCDC
- Spouse: Sandra J Newman
- Children: 3
- Awards: See list
- Scientific career
- Fields: Crystallography
- Institutions: University of British Columbia; Cambridge Crystallographic Data Centre
- Thesis: X-ray structural studies of some biologically significant molecules (1968)
- Doctoral advisor: Donald Rogers

Frank Harmsworth Allen FRSC CChem (1944–2014) was an internationally recognised crystallographer.

== Biography ==
Frank Harmsworth Allen was born in 1944 in Reading, Berkshire and raised in Pangbourne, a village 6 miles away and close to the River Thames. He was the only child of George W Allen and Gwendolen Retta (née Whittamore).

He gained a First in chemistry and a PhD in crystallography at Imperial College London, and in 1968 moved to Vancouver to take up a post-doctoral fellowship, working with James Trotter at the University of British Columbia. Before long, they had established the structure and conformation of thalidomide.

A little earlier, in the Department of Chemistry, University of Cambridge, Olga Kennard had founded the Cambridge Crystallographic Data Centre. She invited Frank Allen to join the group. He began in 1970, becoming Scientific Director and then executive director before retiring in 2008 and taking on the role of Emeritus Research Fellow. Initially, in his new role at Cambridge, Allen turned his attention to data and data processing, using the Cambridge Structural Database (CSD). He worked with W D Samuel Motherwell and others “to write the programs that turned the CSD from a data library into a scientific instrument”.

== Appointments and awards ==
- Won the RSC prize for Structural Chemistry in 1994
- Gained the ACS Herman Skolnik Award in 2003
- Visiting professor of Structural Chemistry at the University of Bristol
- Member of the International Advisory Board of the PDB (RCSB)
- Member of many commissions and committees of the IUCr
- Member of the Council of the European Crystallographic Association
- Vice President of the British Crystallographic Association from 1997 to 2001
- Member of the Board of Lhasa Limited
- Member of the editorial board for Springer Publishing's Structural Chemistry journal.

== Personal life ==
Robin Taylor, CCDC Emeritus Research Fellow, noted that

Frank was a sportsman. He played cricket for his county at school level and opened the bowling for a strong University Chemical Laboratory team. A desire to play cricket was one of his stated reasons for wanting a return home from Canada! He was a mainstay of Sawston hockey club … He sustained frequent injuries, including a broken nose, as is always a possibility when several men in close proximity to one another wave heavy sticks and propel hard spheres at high speed.

He also had a dry sense of humour:

Retino-rectal Connexions

SIR, –Dr Robertson (Nature, 233, 435;
1971) refers to an annoying visual
condition which he calls tunnel vision.
Surely he means hindsight?
Yours faithfully,
F. H. ALLEN
N. W. ISAACS

University Chemical Laboratory,
Lensfield Road,
Cambridge CB2 lEW

Frank married Sandra J Newman (Sandy) in 1966. They had three children: Ashley, Andrew and Stuart. Ashley was killed in a road accident in 1988, aged 20.

Frank Harmsworth Allen died on 10 November 2014. His funeral took place on the 27th at St Andrew's, Histon. He was then buried at Histon and Impington (Mill Road) Cemetery.

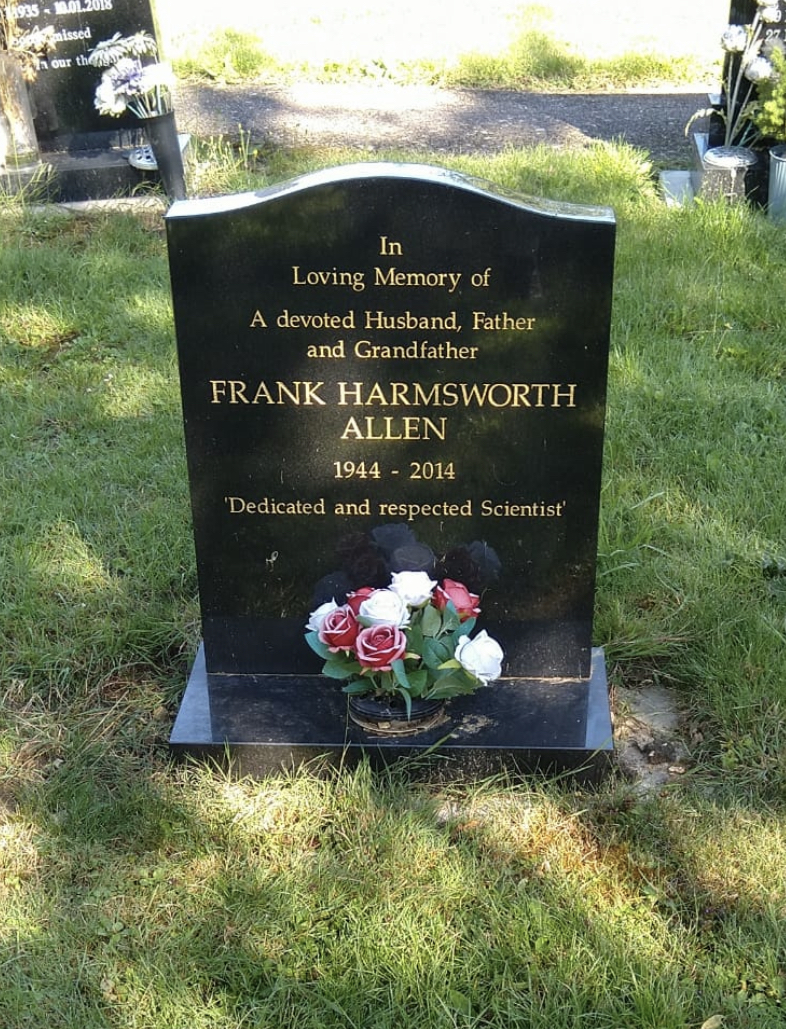
Gravestone in Histon and Impington Cemetery
