= Randy Read =

Canadian-British scientist (born 1957)

Randy Read FRS
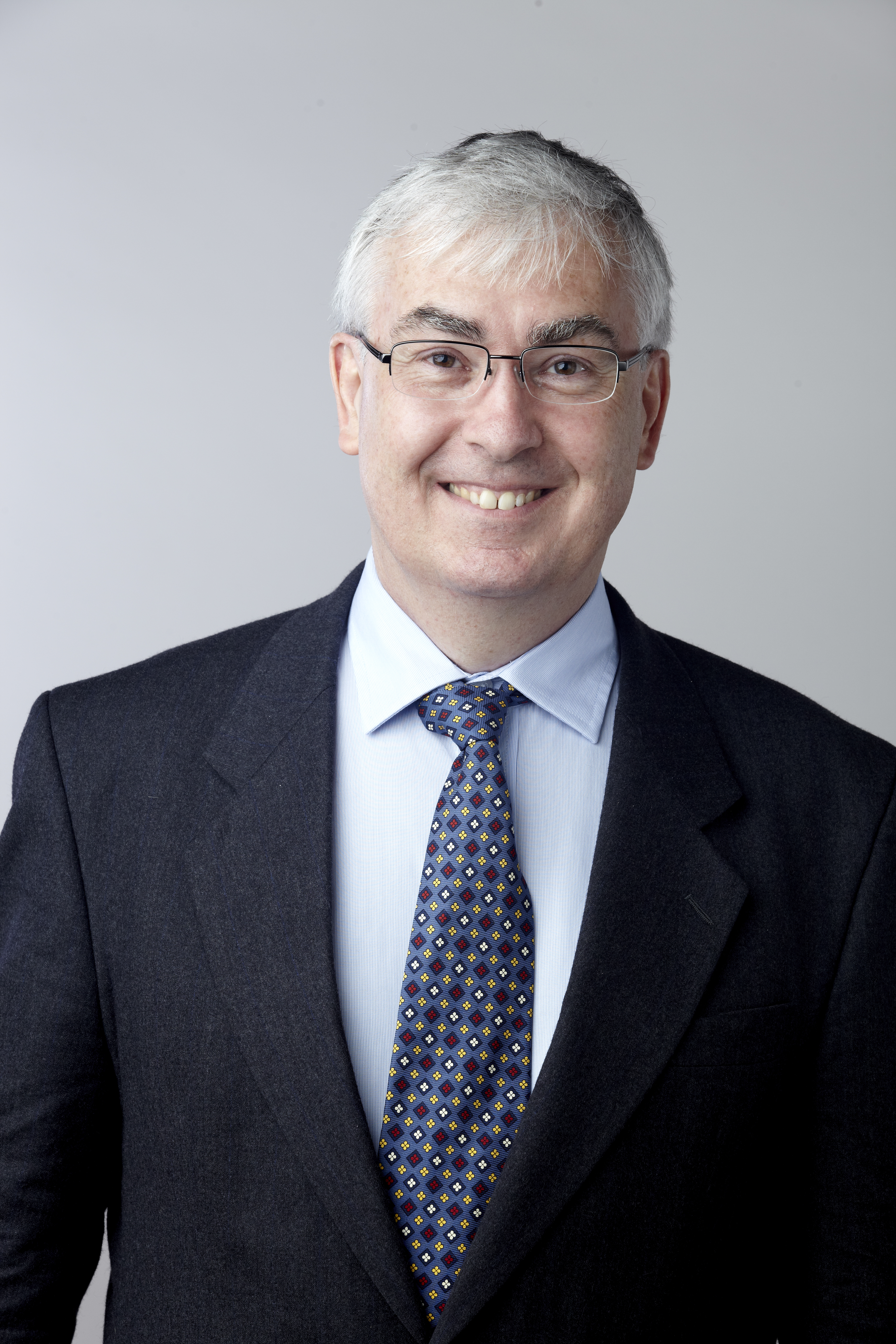
- Randy Read at the Royal Society admissions day in London, July 2014
- Born: Randy John Read; 9 June 1957 (age 69)
- Education: University of Alberta (BSc, PhD)
- Known for: Phaser; PHENIX (Python-based Hierarchical ENvironment for Integrated Xtallography); CCP4
- Awards: Wellcome Trust Principal Research Fellow Max Perutz Prize (European Crystallographic Association), 2013 A. L. Patterson Award (American Crystallographic Association), 2026
- Scientific career
- Fields: Protein crystallography; Maximum likelihood
- Workplaces: University of Cambridge
- Thesis: X-ray crystallographic studies on serine proteinases and their protein inhibitors (1986)
- Doctoral advisor: Michael N. G. James
- Website: www.cimr.cam.ac.uk/staff/professor-randy-j-read-frs

Randy John Read FRS (born 9 June 1957) is a professor of protein crystallography at the University of Cambridge and was a Wellcome Trust Principal Research Fellow.

== Education ==
Read was educated at the University of Alberta in Edmonton, Canada where he was awarded a Bachelor of Science degree in 1979 followed by a PhD in 1986 for X-ray crystallography of serine proteases and their protein inhibitors supervised by Michael N. G. James.

== Career and research ==
Following his PhD, Read was appointed assistant professor from 1988 to 1993 and associate professor from 1993 to 1998 at the University of Alberta. As of 2017, Read's research interests are in protein crystallography and maximum likelihood estimation. His research has been published in leading peer reviewed scientific journals including Nature, Science, the Journal of Applied Crystallography Acta Crystallographica, Structure, PNAS, the Journal of Molecular Biology and the Journal of Clinical Endocrinology and Metabolism.

=== Awards and honours ===
Read was elected Fellow of the Royal Society (FRS) in 2014. His nomination reads:

Professor Read is known internationally for his outstanding and fundamental contributions to the development of macromolecular crystallographic software. His application of maximum likelihood based algorithms to the solution of macromolecular crystal structures by molecular replacement (a technique that uses a known structure of a homologue to solve an unknown structure) has resulted in software (Phaser) that is foremost in the field. He also devised and demonstrated an improved likelihood target function for model refinement that has been adopted by all major refinement programs. In addition, Professor Read has led structural work that has made significant contributions to understanding the mechanisms of proteins relevant to disease (bacterial toxins and serpins).

Read received the Max Perutz Prize of the European Crystallographic Association in 2013 and the A. L. Patterson Award of the American Crystallographic Association in 2026.
