= Natalie Strynadka =

Natalie Strynadka FRS
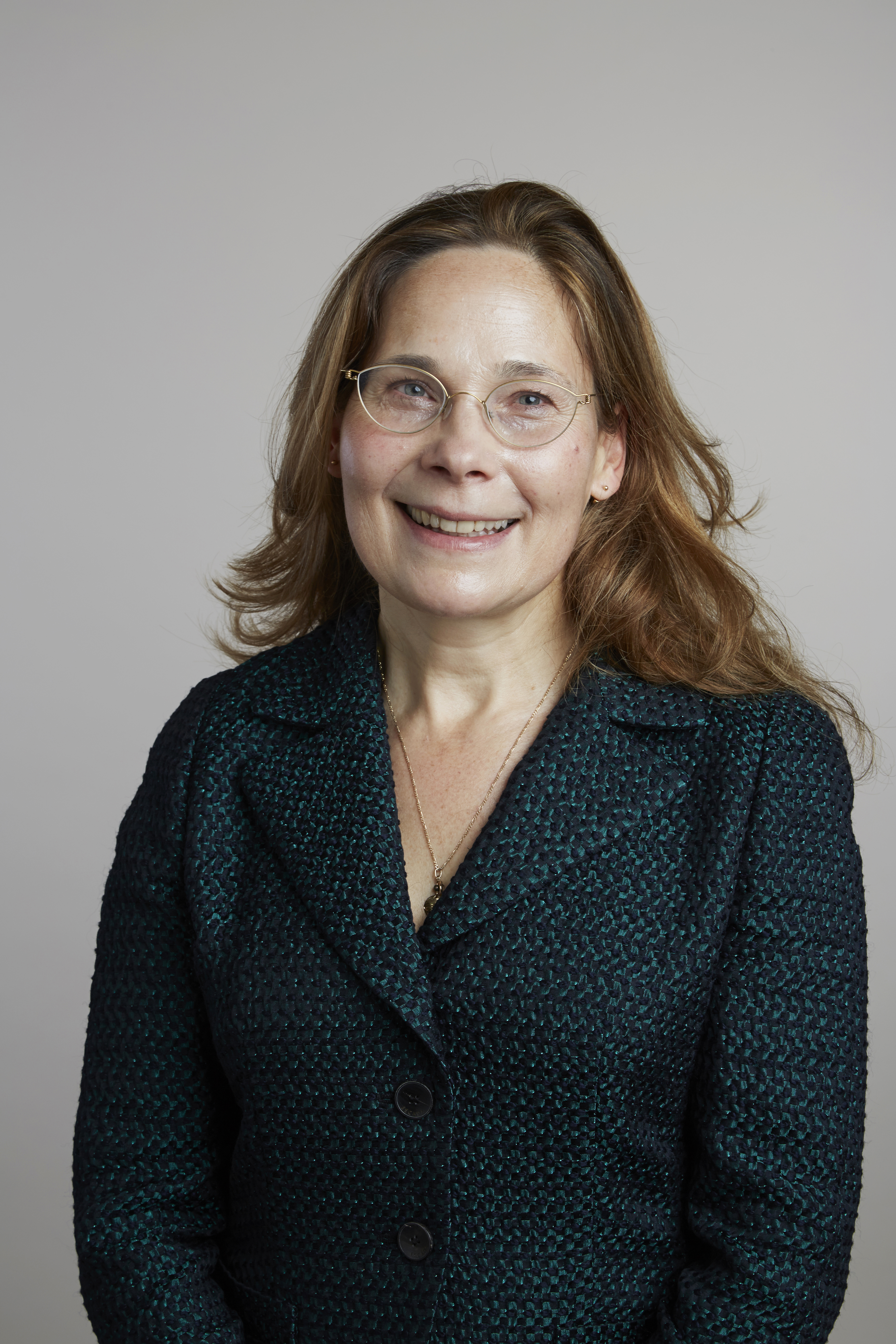
- Strynadka in 2015
- Born: 1963 (age 62–63)
- Education: University of Alberta
- Awards: Prize Steacie (2002); FRS (2015)
- Scientific career
- Fields: Biochemistry; Bacterial cell structure; Beta-lactamase inhibitor proteins
- Workplaces: University of British Columbia; Howard Hughes Medical Institute
- Thesis: Probing molecular interactions at various levels of structural definition (1990)
- Doctoral advisor: Michael N. G. James
- Website: strynadkalab.biochem.ubc.ca; www.hhmi.org/scientists/natalie-cj-strynadka

Natalie C. J. Strynadka is a Canadian biochemist who is a professor of Biochemistry in the Department of Biochemistry and Molecular Biology at the University of British Columbia.

== Education ==
Strynadka was educated at the University of Alberta where she was awarded a PhD in 1990. Her thesis committee included Michael N. G. James and Sir David Chilton Phillips.

== Awards and honours ==
Strynadka was elected a Fellow of the Royal Society (FRS) in 2015. Her certificate of election reads:

Natalie Strynadka is a pioneer in the study of proteins and protein assemblies essential to bacterial pathogenicity and antibiotic resistance. Her agenda-setting dissection of the membrane assemblies involved in infection, virulence and bacterial cell wall synthesis is having major impact in the development of therapeutic agents; both antibiotics and vaccines.
