= JSR =

JSR may refer to:

== Arts and media ==
- Jacobinte Swargarajyam, a 2016 Indian Malayalam film
- Jet Set Radio, a 2000 video game
- Jonathan's Space Report, an online newsletter
- Journal for the Study of Religion
- Journal of Sedimentary Research
- Journal of Service Research
- The Journal of Sex Research
- Journal of Spacecraft and Rockets
- Journal of Synchrotron Radiation

== Computing ==
- JavaScript Registry, an alternative to npmjs.org
- Java Specification Request, a proposed addition to Java
- Jump to subroutine, an assembly instruction

== Places ==
- Jessore Airport, Bangladesh
- John Septimus Roe Anglican Community School, Perth, Australia

== Other uses ==
- Jai Shri Ram, a Hindu slogan and greeting
- Joint spectral radius, in mathematics
- JSR Corporation, a Japanese chemical business
