= CrystalExplorer =

Crystal structure analysis software

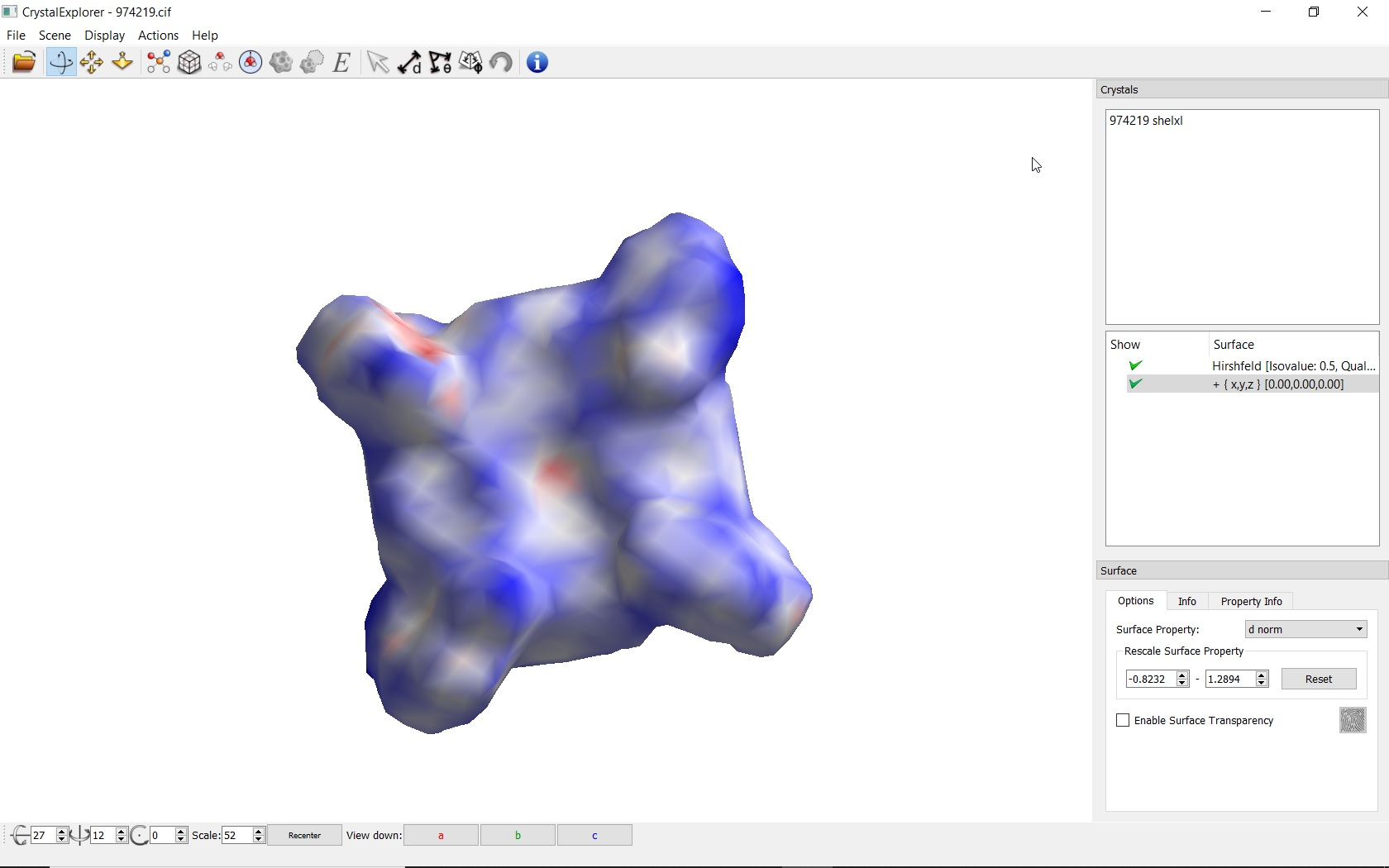
- Screenshot of generated Hirshfeld surface in CrystalExplorer17
- Original authors: D Jayatilaka and MA Spackman
- Initial release: 2007; 19 years ago
- Stable release: CrystalExplorer 21 / 2021; 5 years ago
- Operating system: Windows 10/11 (64 bit), Ubuntu 20.04 LTS, MacOS 10.13+
- License: free-of-charge (Conditions applicable)
- Website: crystalexplorer.net

CrystalExplorer (CE) is a freeware designed to analysis the crystal structure with *.cif file format.

CE is helpful to investigate different areas of solid-state chemistry such as Hirshfeld surface analysis, intermolecular interactions, polymorphism, effect of pressure and temperature on crystal structure, single-crystal to single-crystal reactions, analyzing the voids present in crystal, and structure-property relationships.

The graphical interface of CE towards the 3D crystal structure visualization aids in drawing the crystal structure with or without Hirshfeld surface.

== History ==
CrystalExplorer launched as a graphical user interface which facilitates the visualization of interactions in molecular crystal structures. In 2006, M. A. Spackman's student Dylan Jayatilaka and coworkers presented a paper about their new crystallographic software in the occasion of 23rd European Crystallographic Meeting (ECM23) conducted in Leuven. This software was designed by School of Biomedical and Chemical Sciences, University of Western Australia, Nedlands 6009, Australia. From 2006 onward researchers started citing the program in their research papers.

CrystalExplorer 2.1 designed for Mac OS X, Windows and Linux platforms for the analysis of crystal structures and can be used to investigate many areas of solid-state chemistry such as studying intermolecular interactions, polymorphism, the effects of pressure and temperature on crystal structures, single-crystal to single-crystal reactions, analyzing crystal voids, structure-property relationships, isostructural compounds, and calculate intermolecular interaction energies.

Currently in 2020 September, there are more than 2000 research papers that cite CrystalExplorer software as per google scholar analysis.

== Licence ==
CrystalExplorer17 is licensed free-of-charges under conditions, such as not using the free version of CrystalExplorer to conduct commercial or confidential research, or research that is not likely to be published in a peer-reviewed journal.

== See also ==
- Cambridge Crystallographic Data Centre
- Crystallographic Information File
- International Union of Crystallography
