= Blip =

Blip may refer to:

- Beta-lactamase inhibitor protein
- Blip.tv, a defunct web video platform
- Blip.pl, a Polish social networking site
- Blip, a message in the Apache Wave (formerly Google Wave) collaboration platform
- Blip Festival, an annual chiptune music event
- Blip, a radar display indicator of a reflected signal
- Blip (console), a handheld electromechanical game from the 1970s
- Blip Magazine, a literary publication by the founders of Mississippi Review
- The Blip, a fictional event in the Marvel Cinematic Universe
- "The Blip", a colloquialism referring to the firing of Sam Altman from OpenAI

Blips may refer to:

- BLIPS, a type of illegal tax shelter
- Blips (TV series), a children's show in the UK
- Blips, a series of animated shorts accompanying the Radiohead album Kid A
- Blips, a gang in the film Keanu
