= Cambridge Crystallographic Data Centre =

Crystallographic organisation based in Cambridge, England

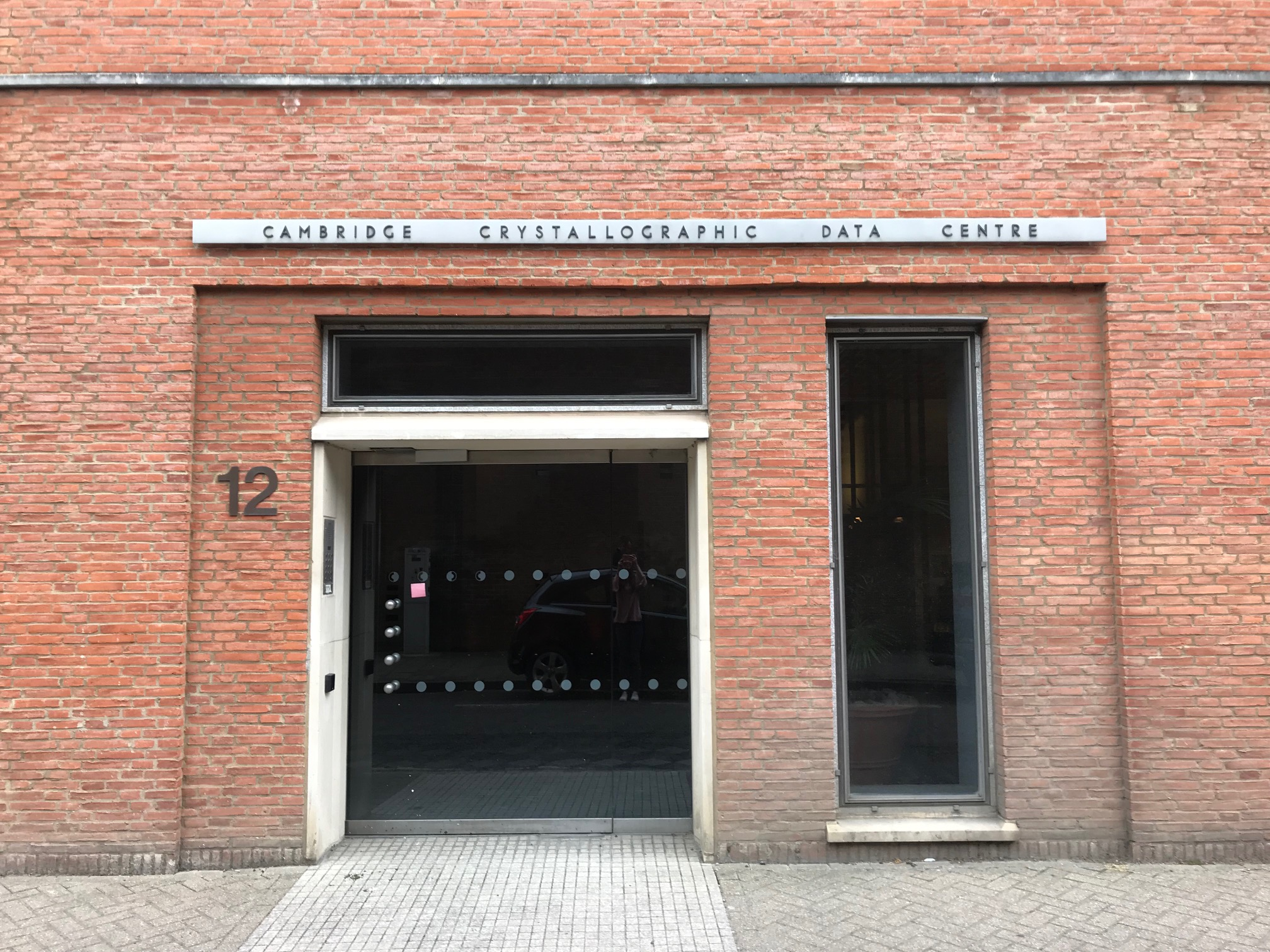
The front entrance of CCDC headquarters in Cambridge, UK

The Cambridge Crystallographic Data Centre (CCDC) is a non-profit organisation based in Cambridge, England. Its primary activity is the compilation and maintenance of the Cambridge Structural Database, a database of small-molecule crystal structures. They also perform analysis on the database for the benefit of the scientific community, and write and distribute computer software to allow others to do the same.

== History ==
In 1962, Dr. Olga Kennard OBE FRS set up a chemical crystallography group within the Department of Chemistry, University of Cambridge. In 1965 she founded the CCDC and established the associated Cambridge Structural Database. At that time, there were only about 3,000 published X-ray structures, and the work involved converting these into a machine-readable form. Kennard invited Frank Allen to join the group, which he did in 1970, becoming Scientific Director and then Executive Director before retiring in 2008.

In 1992, the CCDC moved into its own building adjacent to the Cambridge chemistry department. This new headquarters was designed by the Danish architect Professor Erik Christian Sørensen and won The Sunday Times Building of the Year Award in 1993.

The CCDC still retains very close links as a University Partner Institution that trains students for postgraduate research degrees but from 1987 became an independent company. By 2019 the database had grown to over a million structures.

== Current research ==
The staff at the CCDC curate the database of small-molecule organic and metal-organic crystal structures and make these available for download by the public. They also create and maintain a suite of cheminformatics software that may be used to apply the data to applications in the life sciences, including crystal engineering and materials science.

=== Programs developed ===
CCDC developed programs such as ConQuest and Mercury that run under Windows, various types of Linux, and macOS. ConQuest is a search interface to the Cambridge Structural Database (CSD). Mercury is a crystal structure visualizer tool, of which later versions released in 2015 and later provide the functionality to generate 3D prints.

== See also ==
- Crystallographic database
- Inorganic Crystal Structure Database (ICSD)
- Crystallography Open Database (COD)
- List of chemical databases
- CrystalExplorer
