= Acta Crystallographica Section C =

- Discipline: Crystallography
- Language: English
- Edited by: L. R. Falvello; P. R. Raithby; J. White

Publication details
- Former name: Acta Crystallographica Section C: Crystal Structure Communications
- History: 1983-present
- Publisher: IUCr/Wiley
- Frequency: Monthly
- Open access: Hybrid
- Impact factor: 1.172 (2020)

Standard abbreviations
- ISO 4: Acta Crystallogr. C

Indexing
- CODEN: ACSCGG
- ISSN: 2053-2296

Links
- Journal homepage

Acta Crystallographica Section C: Structural Chemistry is a journal for the rapid publication of research with structural content relating to the chemical sciences.

== Abstracting and indexing ==
The journal is abstracted and indexed in:

- Biological Abstracts
- Cambridge Structural Database
- Ceramic Abstracts
- Chemical Abstracts Service
- Chemistry Citation Index
- Current Chemical Reactions Database
- Current Contents/ Physical, Chemical and Earth Sciences
- Inorganic Crystal Structure Database
- Inspec
- ISI Chemistry Reaction Center
- Medline
- Metals Abstracts/METADEX
- Materials Science Citation Index
- Reaction Citation Index
- Research Alert
- Science Citation Index
- Science Citation Index Expanded
- SCISEARCH
- Scopus
