= NMR-STAR file format =

NMR-STAR
- Extended from: Self-defining Text Archive and Retrieval
- Website: http://www.bmrb.wisc.edu/formats.html

NMR-STAR is an extension of the STAR file format to store the results of biological NMR experiments.
