= Tetrahedron (journal) =

- Discipline: Organic chemistry
- Language: English
- Edited by: Brian M. Stoltz

Publication details
- History: 1957–present
- Publisher: Elsevier (UK)
- Frequency: Weekly
- Impact factor: 2.1 (2022)

Standard abbreviations
- ISO 4: Tetrahedron

Indexing
- CODEN: TETRAB
- ISSN: 0040-4020
- LCCN: 57003385
- OCLC no.: 1606999

Links
- Journal homepage; Online access

Tetrahedron is a weekly peer-reviewed scientific journal covering the field of organic chemistry. According to the Journal Citation Reports, Tetrahedron has a 2020 impact factor of 2.1. Tetrahedron and Elsevier, its publisher, support an annual symposium. In 2010, complaints were raised over its high subscription cost.

== Notable papers ==
As of 22 June 2013, the Web of Science lists ten papers from Tetrahedron that have more than 1000 citations. The four articles that have been cited more than 2000 times are:

- Wiberg, K. B. (1968). "Application of pople-santry-segal CNDO method to the cyclopropylcarbinyl and cyclobutyl cation and to bicyclobutane". Tetrahedron. 24 (3): 1083–1096. doi:10.1016/0040-4020(68)88057-3. – cited 2228 times
- Haasnoot, C. A. G.; de Leeuw, F. A. A. M.; Altona, C. (1980). "The relationship between proton-proton NMR coupling constants and substituent electronegativities—I : An empirical generalization of the Karplus equation". Tetrahedron. 36 (19): 2783–2792. doi:10.1016/0040-4020(80)80155-4. – cited 2162 times
- Grubbs, R. H.; Chang, S. (April 1998). "Recent advances in olefin metathesis and its application in organic synthesis". Tetrahedron. 54 (18): 4413–4450. doi:10.1016/S0040-4020(97)10427-6. – cited 2124 times
- Gasteiger, J.; Marsili, M. (1980). "Iterative partial equalization of orbital electronegativity - A rapid access to atomic charges". Tetrahedron. 36 (22): 3219–3228. doi:10.1016/0040-4020(80)80168-2. – cited 2107 times

== See also ==
- Tetrahedron Letters
- Tetrahedron Computer Methodology
- Polyhedron (journal)
