= Proceedings (disambiguation) =

Proceedings is a collection of academic papers published in the context of an academic conference or workshop.

Proceeding or Proceedings may also refer to:

- Legal proceeding, activity that seeks to invoke the power of a tribunal in order to enforce a law
- Proceedings (magazine), monthly magazine published by the United States Naval Institute
- Certain academic journals published by learned society (Note: One meaning of "proceedings" are the acts and happenings of an academic field or of a learned society. For example, the title of the Acta Crystallographica journals is Neo-Latin for "Proceedings in Crystallography"; the Proceedings of the National Academy of Sciences of the United States of America is the main journal of that academy. Scientific journals whose ISO 4 title abbreviations start with Proc, Acta, or Trans are journals of the proceedings (transactions) of a field or of an organization concerned with it, in that secondary meaning of the word.)
