= Wellcome Trust Principal Research Fellowship =

Wellcome Trust Principal Research Fellowship (PRF)
- Location: London
- Country: United Kingdom
- Website: wellcome.ac.uk/funding/principal-research-fellowships

Wellcome Trust Principal Research Fellowships are research fellowships awarded to scientists who are recognised by the Wellcome Trust as having "international standing with an established track record in research at the highest level."

Awards provide salary and research programme funding in full for seven years initially, and may then be renewed with the host institution contributing 50%.

== Research Fellows ==
As of 2017 Fellows include Randy Read and Dorothy Bishop.
