= French Crystallographic Association =

- L’Association française de cristallographie
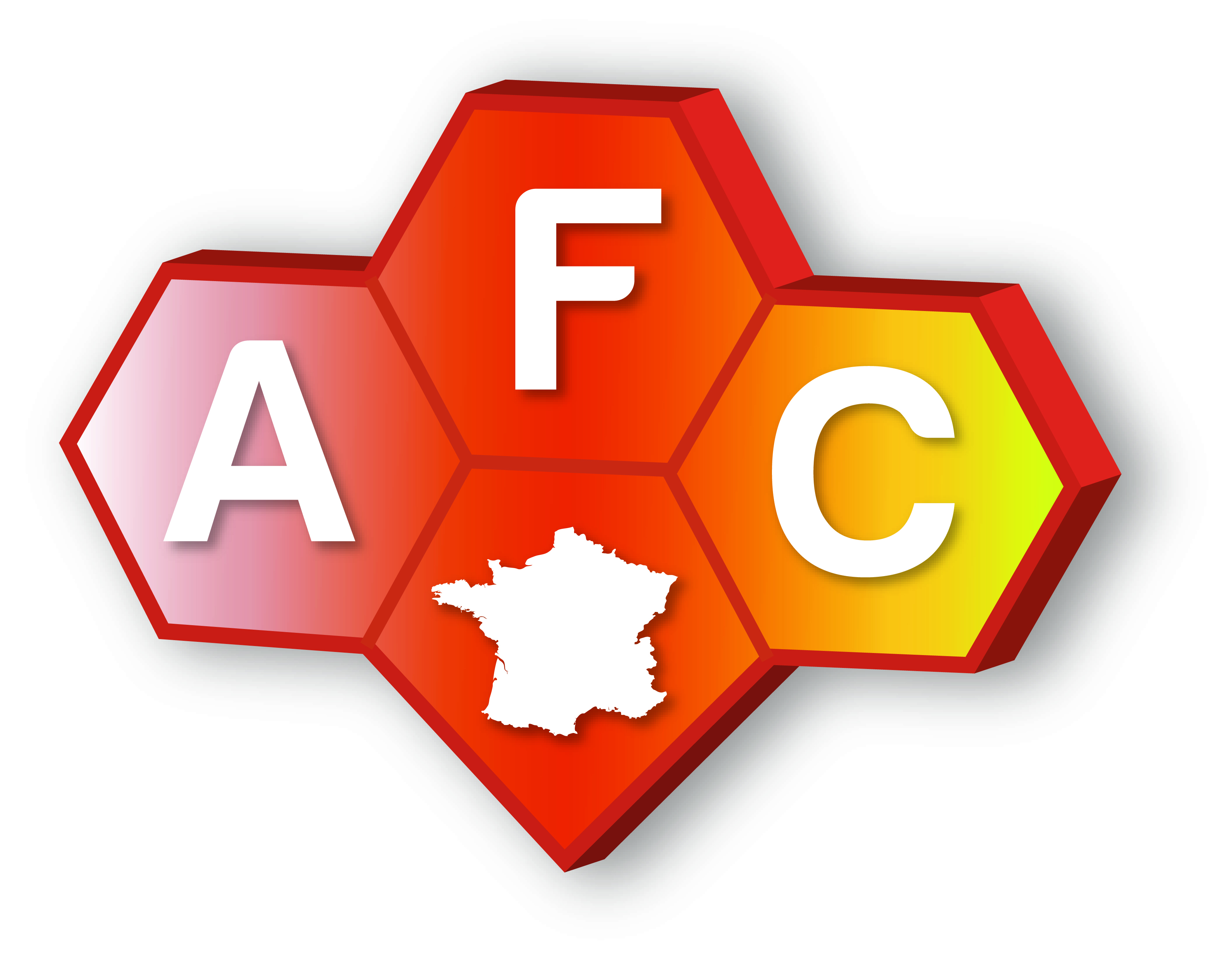
- Abbreviation: AFC
- Formation: 1953; 73 years ago
- Purpose: Promotion of crystallographic science and research
- Headquarters: Paris, France
- Leader: Claude Sauter
- Website: www.afc.asso.fr

The French Crystallographic Association (French: L’Association française de cristallographie or AFC) brings together physicists, chemists and biologists that use crystals and crystallography in their research or develop new crystallographic methods. Originally part of the French Society of Mineralogy, the AFC was founded in 1953 by Hubert Curien and André Guinier.

Today, its main goals are to promote dissemination of knowledge and exchange between French speaking crystallographers from all fields, and in particular to organize or support specialized or interdisciplinary workshops and conferences, educational actions and training courses in the area of crystallography. During the biannual AFC conferences, the AFC awards three PhD prizes in each of its research areas: Physics, Chemistry and Biology.

Claude Sauter, scientist at the Institut de Biologie Moléculaire et Cellulaire in Strasbourg is the President of the AFC from January 1st, 2022.

== Presidents of the AFC ==
- André Guinier
- Robert Gay
- Jean Wyart
- 1962 Erwin Félix Lewy-Bertaut
- 1965 Hubert Curien
- 1970-1972 André Authier
- 1972-1973 Stanislas Goldstaub
- 1981-1983 Jean Meinnel
- 1984-1987 Jean-François Petroff
- 1987-1990 Michel Hospital
- 1990-1993 Massimo Marezio
- 1994-1997 Roger Fourme
- 1997-2002 Claude Lecomte
- 2003-2007 Jean-Louis Hodeau
- 2008-2010 Jean-Claude Daran
- 2011-2013 Jacqueline Cherfils
- 2013-2016 René Guinebretière
- 2017-2021 Philippe Guionneau
- 2022-2025 Claude Sauter

== See also ==
- International Union of Crystallography
- European Crystallographic Association
