= Journal of Synchrotron Radiation =

- Discipline: Synchrotron radiation, crystallography
- Language: English
- Edited by: Andrew J. Allen

Publication details
- History: 1994-present
- Publisher: Wiley-Blackwell on behalf of the International Union of Crystallography
- Frequency: Bimonthly
- Open access: Yes
- Impact factor: 2.557 (2021)

Standard abbreviations
- ISO 4: J. Synchrotron Radiat.

Indexing
- CODEN: JSYRES
- ISSN: 0909-0495 (print); 1600-5775 (web)
- LCCN: 95660002
- OCLC no.: 44164087

Links
- Journal homepage; Online access; Online archive; Journal page at society's website

The Journal of Synchrotron Radiation is a bimonthly peer-reviewed scientific journal published by Wiley-Blackwell on behalf of the International Union of Crystallography. It was established in 1994 and covers research on synchrotron radiation and X-ray free-electron lasers and their applications. The editor-in-chief is Andrew J. Allen (National Institute of Standards and Technology). In January 2022, the journal became fully open access.

== Abstracting and indexing ==
The journal is abstracted and indexed in:

- Ceramic Abstracts
- Chemical Abstracts Service
- Cambridge Structural Database
- Current Contents/ Physical, Chemical and Earth Sciences
- Inorganic Crystal Structure Database
- International Nuclear Information System
- Inspec
- Metals Abstracts/METADEX
- Science Citation Index
- Scopus

According to the Journal Citation Reports, the journal has a 2021 impact factor of 2.557, ranking it 30th out of 64 journals in the category "Instruments & Instrumentation" and 50th out of 101 journals in the category "Optics".
