= Self-defining Text Archive and Retrieval =

File format for structured data

- Developed by: Sydney R. Hall
- Initial release: 1991
- Extended to: Crystallographic Information File, Dictionary Definition Language

The Self-Defining Text Archive and Retrieval (STAR) File, or simply the STAR File, is a text-based file format for storing structured data. It was proposed in 1991 by Sydney R. Hall. The format became widely used in molecular-structure sciences, although it is not specific to this field—it was designed as a universal approach to electronic data exchange and archiving.

One characteristic feature of the STAR File format is that data names (keys in key–value pairs) start with the underscore. They are separated from data values only by white space, for example:

_format "STAR File"
_first_published 1991

The format was designed to provide a concise syntax for tabular data. The construct for this is called loop. Loops start with the loop_ keyword followed by names corresponding to columns and then by values.

loop_
_geom_bond_atom_site_label_1
_geom_bond_atom_site_label_2
_geom_bond_distance
O1 C8 1.301(3)
O1 Na1 2.161(2)
O2 C36 1.425(4)
O2 C39 1.425(4)
O2 Na1 2.514(3)
O3 C31 1.421(4)
# ...

Using a "Dictionary Definition Language" file, itself a STAR File, STAR sub-formats can be defined for particular use cases. One notable STAR-based format is the Crystallographic Information File format.

The "STAR FILE" name is a registered trade mark of the International Union of Crystallography.

== See also ==
- Hall, Sydney R. (1991). "The STAR file: a new format for electronic data transfer and archiving". J. Chem. Inf. Comput. Sci. 31 (2): 326–333. doi:10.1021/ci00002a020.
- Hall, Sydney R.; Spadaccini, Nick (1994). "The STAR File: detailed specifications". J. Chem. Inf. Comput. Sci. 34 (3): 505–508. doi:10.1021/ci00019a005.
- Spadaccini, Nick; Hall, Sydney R. (2012). "Extensions to the STAR File Syntax". J. Chem. Inf. Model. 52 (8): 1901–1906. doi:10.1021/ci300074v. PMID 22725659.
