= Olga Kennard =

Hungarian-born British crystallographer (1924–2023)

Olga Kennard OBE FRS
- Kennard on the 50th anniversary of the CCDC in 2015
- Born: Olga Weisz; 23 March 1924; Budapest, Kingdom of Hungary
- Died: 1 March 2023 (aged 98)
- Education: Newnham College, Cambridge
- Known for: Crystallography of organic molecules
- Spouses: David Kennard (m. 1948–1961); Arnold Burgen (m. 1994)
- Children: 2
- Scientific career
- Fields: Crystallography
- Workplaces: University of Cambridge, Cavendish Laboratory, Cambridge Crystallographic Data Centre

Olga Kennard, Lady Burgen (née Weisz; 23 March 1924 – 1 March 2023) was a Hungarian-born British scientist who specialised in crystallography. She was the founder of the Cambridge Crystallographic Data Centre.

Kennard's research focused on determining the structures of organic molecules, including the first three-dimensional structure of adenosine triphosphate and particularly the different forms of DNA.

Together with JD Bernal she believed in the value of collating scientific data in a central archive, this began the Cambridge Structural Database (CSD), collating crystal structures of mainly organic molecules. Kennard was also involved, at CSD, in the founding of the Protein Data Bank, and of the EMBL nucleotide sequence data library (later, European Nucleotide Archive).

== Early life and education ==
Kennard was born in Budapest, Hungary on 23 March 1924, to Joir and Catherina Weisz. She moved to the United Kingdom at the age of 15 with her family in the face of growing antisemitism in Hungary. In the UK she was educated at Hove County School for Girls and Prince Henry VIII Grammar School, Evesham. She attended Newnham College, Cambridge, studying Natural Sciences at a time when women did not formally receive a degree. She went on to gain an MA in 1948.

== Career ==
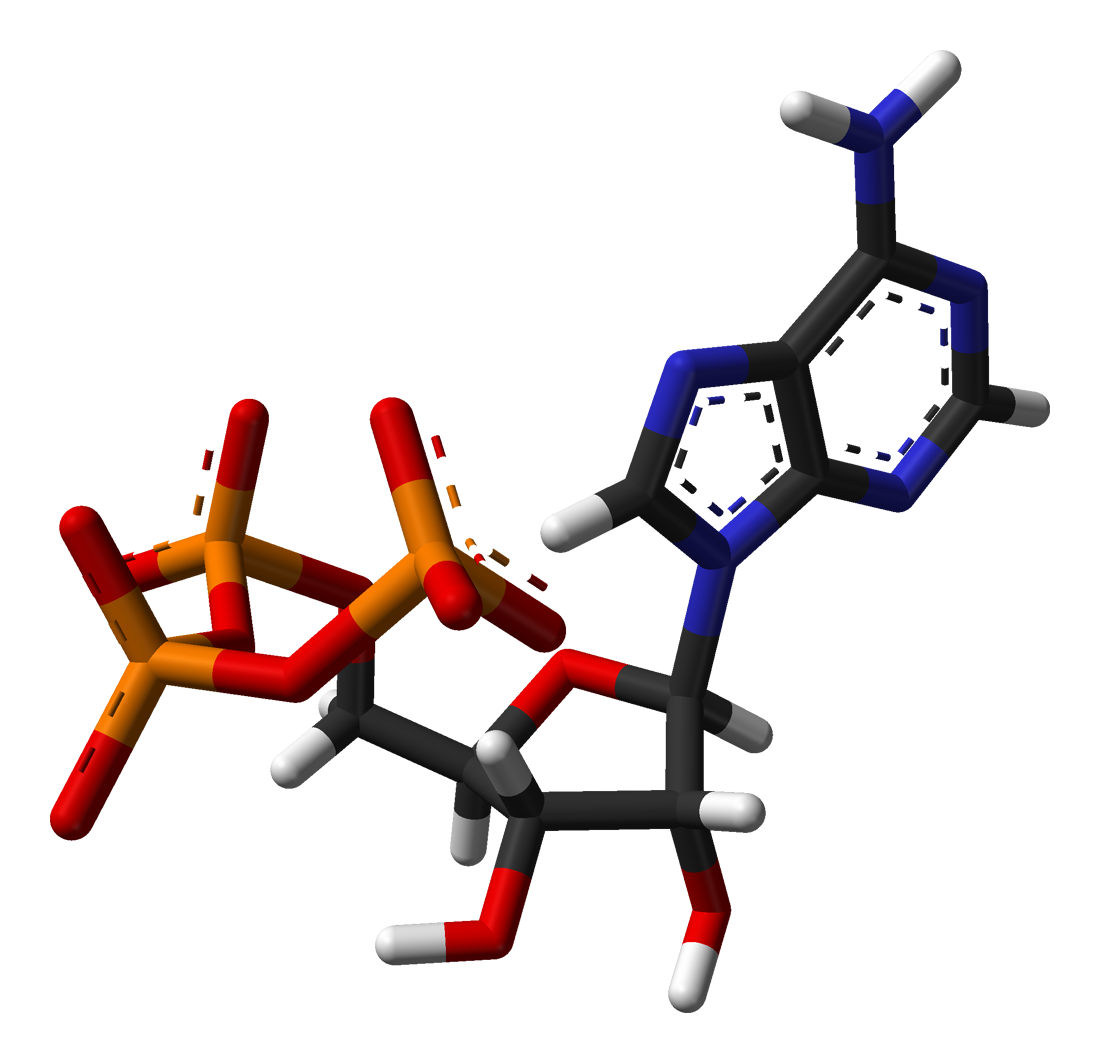
Stick model of adenosine triphosphate (ATP), based on x-ray diffraction data from Olga Kennard, N. W. Isaacs, W. D. S. Motherwell, J. C. Coppola, D. L. Wampler, A. C. Larson, D. G. Watson (1971). "The Crystal and Molecular Structure of Adenosine Triphosphate".

Following her studies, Kennard worked as a research assistant at the Cavendish Laboratory, Cambridge from 1944 to 1948, working with Max Perutz on the structure of hemoglobin. After this she moved to London, working at the Medical Research Council RC Vision Research Unit from 1948 to 1951. In this role she studied rhodopsin and vitamin A with Hamilton Hartridge. Subsequently, she was a research assistant, establishing a crystallographic lab at the MRC National Institute for Medical Research. In 1961 Kennard returned to work in Cambridge (where she had lived whilst working in London) to the University's chemistry department to set up a Crystallography Unit. She remained in this department until retirement but never held a University post as she was seconded from the MRC. During her career she produced over 200 scientific papers and wrote several books.

In 1972, Kennard was among a small group of crystallographers who set up the European Crystallographic Committee (now the European Crystallographic Association) and she became its president from 1975–81.

Kennard was best known as a founder of the Cambridge Structural Database and first director (from 1965 to 1997) of the Cambridge Crystallographic Data Centre. The resource was borne of her belief that "collective use of data would lead to the discovery of new knowledge which transcends the results of individual experiments".

Kennard held an MRC special appointment from 1974 to 1989 and was visiting professor at the University of London from 1988 to 1990.

== Honours and awards ==
Kennard was awarded a doctorate of science by Cambridge in 1973 and elected a Fellow of the Royal Society (FRS) in 1987 and appointed an Officer of the Order of the British Empire (OBE) "for services to Scientific Research on the Structure of Biological Molecules" in the 1988 Birthday Honours. In recognition of her work, an Olga Kennard Research Fellowship in crystallography was created, administered by the Royal Society. The awardee from 2017–22 was Jon Agirre (University of York).

In 1993 she was elected a member of the Academia Europaea.

In 2003 the University of Cambridge made her a Doctor of Law honoris causa.

In 2021, the IUCr awarded Dr. Kennard the 12th Ewald Prize for her "invaluable pioneering contribution to the development of crystallographic databases".

In September 2022, the Royal Swedish Academy of Sciences announced it would award Dr. Kennard the Gregori Aminoff Prize for 2023.

== Personal life and death ==
In 1948, Kennard (then Weisz) married David Kennard, taking his surname. The couple had two daughters before they divorced in 1961. After the divorce, Olga Kennard brought up the girls by herself.

In 1994, Kennard married Sir Arnold Burgen; they remained married until his death in May 2022.

After retirement, Kennard was appointed a trustee of the British Museum in 2004, a position held until 2012. She was an 'architecture aficionado' and lived in a Grade II listed house designed by Danish architect Erik Sorensen.

The National Portrait Gallery holds her portrait.

Kennard died on 1 March 2023, at the age of 98.

A special issue of ACS Crystal Growth and Design was dedicated to Olga Kennard after her death.

Kennard had two younger siblings, Judith and George Weisz. George Weisz was the father of the famous English actress Rachel Weisz.
