= Acta Crystallographica Section E =

- Discipline: Crystallography
- Language: English
- Edited by: G. Diaz de Delgado; C. Massera; S. Parkin; L. Van Meervelt

Publication details
- Former name: Acta Crystallographica Section E: Structure Reports Online
- History: 2001-present
- Publisher: IUCr/Wiley
- Frequency: Monthly
- Open access: Yes
- Impact factor: 0.347 (2011)

Standard abbreviations
- ISO 4: Acta Crystallogr. E

Indexing
- CODEN: ACSECI
- ISSN: 2056-9890

Links
- Journal homepage

Acta Crystallographica Section E: Crystallographic Communications is an open-access structural communications journal. It reports crystal structure determinations of inorganic, metal-organic and organic compounds. Since 2012, Acta Crystallogr. E has not been included in the Science Citation Index.

== Abstracting and indexing ==
The journal is abstracted and indexed in:

- Cambridge Structural Database
- Ceramic Abstracts
- Chemical Abstracts Service
- Emerging Sources Citation Index
- Inorganic Crystal Structure Database
- Inspec
- Medline
- Metals Abstracts/METADEX
- Scopus
