= Journal of Applied Crystallography =

- Discipline: Applied crystallography
- Language: English, French, Russian
- Edited by: Janos Hajdu; Garry J. McIntyre; Flora Meilleur

Publication details
- History: 1968-present
- Publisher: IUCr/Wiley
- Frequency: Bimonthly
- Impact factor: 6.1 (2022)

Standard abbreviations
- ISO 4: J. Appl. Crystallogr.

Indexing
- CODEN: JACGAR
- ISSN: 1600-5767
- LCCN: 68007471
- OCLC no.: 44114793

Links
- Journal homepage

The Journal of Applied Crystallography is a peer-reviewed scientific journal published by Wiley-Blackwell on behalf of the International Union of Crystallography. It was established in 1968 with André Guinier as the founding editor. The journal covers the application of crystallography and crystallographic techniques. William Parrish (1914–1991) chaired the committee that started the journal.

The Journal of Applied Crystallography publishes articles on the crystallographic methods that are used to study crystalline and non-crystalline matter with neutrons, X-rays and electrons, their application in condensed matter research, materials science and the life sciences, and their use in identifying phase transformations and structural changes of defects, structure-property relationships, interfaces and surfaces etc. The journal also covers developments in crystallographic instrumentation and apparatus, theory and interpretation and numerical analysis and other related subjects, together with information on crystallographic computer programs.

== Abstracting and indexing ==
The journal is abstracted and indexed in:

- Chemistry Citation Index
- Ceramic Abstracts
- Chemical Abstracts Service
- Cambridge Structural Database
- Current Contents/ Physical, Chemical and Earth Sciences
- Inorganic Crystal Structure Database
- Inspec
- Metals Abstracts/METADEX
- Materials Science Citation Index
- Reaction Citation Index
- Science Citation Index
- Scopus
