= Tetrahedron Letters =

- Discipline: Organic chemistry
- Language: English

Publication details
- History: 1959–present
- Publisher: Elsevier (United Kingdom)
- Frequency: weekly
- Impact factor: 1.8 (2022)

Standard abbreviations
- ISO 4: Tetrahedron Lett.

Indexing
- ISSN: 0040-4039

Links
- Journal homepage; Archive

Tetrahedron Letters is a weekly international journal for rapid publication of full original research papers in the field of organic chemistry. According to the Journal Citation Reports, the journal has a 2022 impact factor of 1.8

== Indexing ==
Tetrahedron Letters is indexed in:

- AGRICOLA
- BIOSIS
- Beilstein database
- CAB Abstracts
- Chemical Abstracts
- Chemical Engineering Biotechnology Abstracts
- Current Biotechnology Abstracts
- Current Contents Search
- Current Contents/Life Sciences
- Current Contents/Physics, Chemical, & Earth Sciences
- Derwent Drug File
- El Compendex Plus
- Excerpta Medica
- MEDLINE
- Pascal
- Research Alert
- Science Citation Index
- Scisearch
- Scopus

== See also ==
- Tetrahedron
- Tetrahedron: Asymmetry
