= Hubert Curien =

French physicist

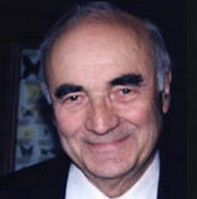

Minister of Research and Technology
- In office 1984–1986
- President: François Mitterrand
- Prime Minister: Laurent Fabius
- Preceded by: Nicole Cathala
- Succeeded by: Robert Chapuis

Personal details
- Born: 30 October 1924 Cornimont, France
- Died: 6 February 2005 (aged 80) Loury, France
- Spouse: Perrine Dumézil
- Children: 3
- Education: Lycée Saint-Louis
- Alma mater: École normale supérieure
- Occupation: Physicist
- Awards: Honda Prize (1998); Allan D. Emil Memorial Award (1993)

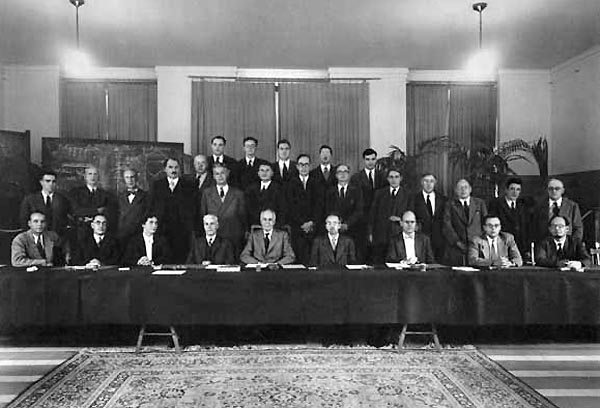
Solvay Conference on Physics in Brussels 1951. Left to right, sitting: Crussaro, N.P. Allen, Cauchois, Borelius, Bragg, Moller, Sietz, Hollomon, Frank; middle row: Rathenau,^{(nl)} Koster, Rudberg,^{(sv)}, Flamache, Goche, Groven, Orowan, Burgers, Shockley, Guinier, C.S. Smith, Dehlinger, Laval, Henriot; top row: Gaspart, Lomer, Cottrell, Homes, Curien

Hubert Curien (30 October 1924 – 6 February 2005) was a French physicist and a key figure in European science politics, as the President of CERN Council (1994–1996), the first chairman of the European Space Agency (ESA) (1981–1984), and second President of the Academia Europæa and a President of Fondation de France.

== Biography ==
Born in Cornimont, Vosges in Lorraine, Curien enlisted in the French resistance during World War II. After the war he studied physics at the École normale supérieure in Paris.

Curien became the director general of the Centre National de la Recherche Scientifique (CNRS) in 1969, and was one of the founders of the European Science Foundation and chairman from 1979 to 1984. He was also head of the French space agency from 1976 to 1984, and first chairman of the board of ESA from 1981 to 1984.

Curien was the Minister of Research of France from 1984 to 1986 and from 1988 to 1993. He entered the French Academy of Sciences in 1994.

Curien was the President of the Fondation de France from 1998 through 2000.

Two years later, in November 2002, he retired from CERN after 38 years of contribution to accelerator projects, starting as a fellow in 1964.

As a tribute to Curien, the French Ministry of Foreign Affairs has decided to rename its bilateral scientific exchange programmes, previously referred to as "Integrated Action Programmes" or "PAI" to "Hubert Curien Partnerships" or "PHC". The French Ministry of Foreign Affairs has such "Hubert Curien Partnerships" with more than 60 countries of the world.

The 2004 Forum Engelberg also paid tribute to their President Curien for the occasion of his upcoming 80th birthday.

In honor of his contribution to European space, it was decided by ESA, NASA, and the international Committee for Space Research (COSPAR) to name the landing site of the Huygens probe after him, and from 14 March 2007 it is known as the "Hubert Curien Memorial Station".

His son Pierre-Louis Curien is a noted theoretical computer scientist.

== See also ==
- French Crystallographic Association
- Hubert Curien Laboratory
- Hubert Curien Pluridisciplinary Institute
