= Michael N. G. James =

Canadian biochemist (born 1940)

Michael James OC FRS FRSC
- Born: Michael Norman George James; May 16, 1940; Vancouver, Canada
- Died: July 24, 2023 (aged 83); Edmonton, Alberta, Canada
- Education: University of Manitoba (BSc, MSc); University of Oxford (DPhil)
- Awards: Officer of the Order of Canada (2023); Fellow of the Royal Society (1989)
- Scientific career
- Workplaces: University of Alberta
- Thesis: X-ray crystallographic studies of some antibiotic peptides (1966)
- Doctoral advisor: Dorothy Hodgkin
- Doctoral students: Randy Read; Natalie Strynadka
- Website: xray.biochem.ualberta.ca

Michael Norman George James OC FRS FRSC (born 1940) (died 2023) was Emeritus Distinguished Professor of Biochemistry at the University of Alberta. He was elected a Fellow of the Royal Society (FRS) in 1989 for "substantial contributions to the improvement of natural knowledge". He was appointed to the Order of Canada in June 2023, with the rank of Officer. He lived in Edmonton.
