= Santiago García Granda =

US academic

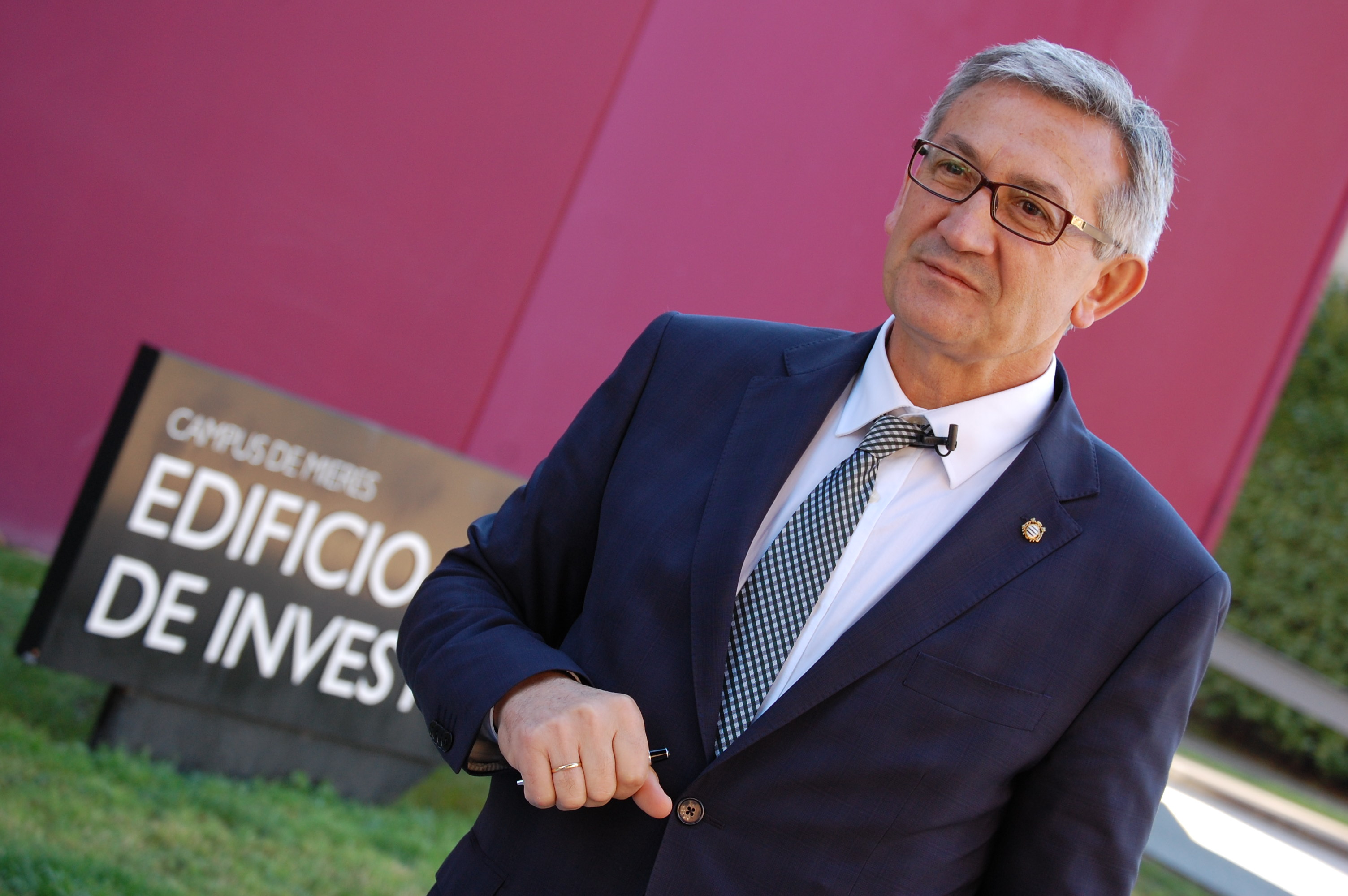

Santiago Garcia Granda (born 1955 in Verdicio, Asturias), studied chemistry and graduated in 1980, and earned his PhD in 1984 at the University of Oviedo. He completed his academic training as a postdoctoral fellow at the University of Nijmegen, Holland with Professor Paul T. Beurskens. He specialised in structural determination, crystallography, diffraction and methods of calculations. He is ex-president of the European Crystallographic Association (ECA) where he has served since August 2006 and in August 2014 was elected ordinary member of the executive committee of the International Union of Crystallography.

He also teaches chemistry and bilingual degree and master courses, Spanish-English, at the University of Oviedo and the Menéndez Pelayo International University. He has supervised more than 25 PhD theses.

He is the author of more than 900 scientific and dissemination papers, several chapters of books and numerous communications and lectures presented in conferences on physico-chemical studies of new materials, molecular structure, crystallography, diffraction and methods of calculation. He is co-author of the crystallography programme DirDif cited more than 3000 times and he has led more than 50 research projects, both national and European, establishing contracts with firms and scientific dissemination projects. He is the head of the SYSTAM research group of the Department of Physical and Analytical Chemistry, declared Group of Excellence of the Principality of Asturias in 2001. He was responsible for the infrastructure installation in the Spanish line of the ESRF.

In 2016, he joined the elections to become rector of the University of Oviedo, and he was the winning candidate. From 2008 to April 2012 he was Vice rector for Research of the University of Oviedo, and Executive Secretary of the Sectoral R+D of the CRUE. During the 46 years he has been devoted to the University of Oviedo, he has held several positions and undertaken different academic tasks and duties.

== Sources ==
- MASTER'S DEGREE IN CRYSTALLOGRAPHY AND CRYSTALLIZATION - UIMP
- Scholar Google Profile
- Profile in Researchgate.net
- Structural and optical properties of hydrothermally-synthesized single-crystalline Sb2O3 nanowires
- Chiral Triazolium Salts and Ionic Liquids: From the Molecular Design Vectors to Their Physical Properties through Specific Supramolecular Interactions - IQAC- CSIC
- Ferrer, S., Lloret, F., Bertomeu, I., Alzuet, G., Borrás, J., García-Granda, S., ... & Haasnoot, J. G. (2002). Cyclic Trinuclear and Chain of Cyclic Trinuclear Copper (II) Complexes Containing a Pyramidal Cu_{3}O(H) Core. Crystal Structures and Magnetic Properties of [Cu_{3}(μ_{3}-OH) (aaat)_{3}(H_{2}O)_{3}](NO_{3})_{2}•H_{2}O[aaat = 3-Acetylamino-5-amino-1,2,4-triazolate] and {[Cu_{3}(μ_{3}-OH)(aat)_{3} (μ_{3}-SO_{4})]• 6H_{2}O}_{n}[aat = 3-Acetylamino-1,2,4-triazolate]: New Cases of Spin-Frustrated Systems. Inorganic chemistry, 41(22), 5821-5830.
