= Derwent Drug File =

Derwent Drug file, formerly known as Ringdoc, is an information monitoring, abstracting and documentation service, specifically designed to meet the information needs of people requiring information on pharmaceuticals. The Derwent Drug File provides all relevant and important information for the whole life-cycle of a drug, from drug design to use. The Derwent Drug File concentrates information about the drug itself and its use. Online file contains over 1.5 million records from 1964 to present.
