= Tetrahedron Computer Methodology =

- Language: English

Publication details
- History: 1988-1992
- Publisher: Elsevier

Standard abbreviations
- ISO 4: Tetrahedron Comput. Methodol.

Indexing
- CODEN: TCMTE6
- ISSN: 0898-5529
- LCCN: 2010219022
- OCLC no.: 17847665

Links
- Journal homepage

The Tetrahedron Computer Methodology was a short lived journal that was published by Pergamon Press (now Elsevier) to experiment with electronic submission of articles in the ChemText format, and the sharing source code to enable reproducibility. It was the first chemical journal to be published electronically, with issues distributed in print and on floppy disks. It is likely it was also the first journal to accept submissions in a non-paper format (on floppy disks). The journal ceased publication owing to technical and non-technical reasons, and may have lacked sufficient institutional support. The last issue appeared in 1992 but was dated 1990.
