= Acta Crystallographica Section F =

- Discipline: Crystallography
- Language: English
- Edited by: Maria Cristina Nonato; Mark van Raaij; Jon Agirre

Publication details
- Former names: Acta Crystallographica Section F: Structural Biology and Crystallization Communications
- History: 2005–present
- Publisher: IUCr/Wiley
- Frequency: Monthly
- Open access: Hybrid
- Impact factor: 1.056 (2020)

Standard abbreviations
- ISO 4: Acta Crystallogr. F

Indexing
- CODEN: ACSFEN
- ISSN: 2053-230X

Links
- Journal homepage

Acta Crystallographica Section F is a rapid structural biology communications journal. It publishes short papers on biological structures and any aspects of structural biology.

== Abstracting and indexing ==
The journal is abstracted and indexed in:

- Biochemistry and Biophysics Citation Index
- Biological Abstracts
- BIOSIS Previews
- Chemical Abstracts Service
- Medline
- Nucleic Acid Database
- Protein Data Bank
- Science Citation Index Expanded
- Scopus
