= Polyhedron (journal) =

- Discipline: Inorganic chemistry
- Language: English
- Edited by: G. Christou, G.R. Desiraju, C.E. Housecroft, A-V. Mudring

Publication details
- Former names: Journal of Inorganic and Nuclear Chemistry
- History: 1955–present
- Publisher: Elsevier
- Frequency: 18/year
- Impact factor: 3.052 (2020)

Standard abbreviations
- ISO 4: Polyhedron

Indexing
- CODEN: PLYHDE
- ISSN: 0277-5387
- LCCN: 82643589
- OCLC no.: 771157632

Links
- Journal homepage; Online access; Archives of Journal of Inorganic and Nuclear Chemistry (1955–1981)

Polyhedron is a peer-reviewed scientific journal covering the field of inorganic chemistry. It was established in 1955 as the Journal of Inorganic and Nuclear Chemistry and is published by Elsevier.

== Abstracting and indexing ==
Polyhedron is abstracted and indexed in:

- BIOSIS
- Chemical Abstracts
- Current Contents/Physics, Chemical, & Earth Sciences
- Inspec
- Science Citation Index
- Scopus

According to the Journal Citation Reports, the journal has a 2020 impact factor of 3.052.
