= Cambridge Structural Database =

Repository for small molecule crystal structures

Content
- Description: Molecular structure elucidation; X-ray crystallography; Cheminformatics; Organic compound; Metalorganic; Organometallic; Chemical structure; Drug discovery; Materials science

Contact
- Research center: Cambridge Crystallographic Data Centre

Access
- Data format: .cif
- Website: www.ccdc.cam.ac.uk
- Web service URL: www.ccdc.cam.ac.uk/structures

Tools
- Web: WebCSD
- Standalone: CSD System; CSD (the database); ConQuest; Mercury; IsoStar; Mogul; GOLD; CSD-CrossMiner

The Cambridge Structural Database (CSD) is both a repository and a validated and curated resource for the three-dimensional structural data of molecules generally containing at least carbon and hydrogen, comprising a wide range of organic, metal-organic and organometallic molecules. The specific entries are complementary to the other crystallographic databases such as the Protein Data Bank (PDB), Inorganic Crystal Structure Database and International Centre for Diffraction Data. The data, typically obtained by X-ray crystallography and less frequently by electron diffraction or neutron diffraction, and submitted by crystallographers and chemists from around the world, are freely accessible (as deposited by authors) on the Internet via the CSD's parent organization's website (CCDC, Repository). The CSD is overseen by the not-for-profit incorporated company called the Cambridge Crystallographic Data Centre, CCDC.

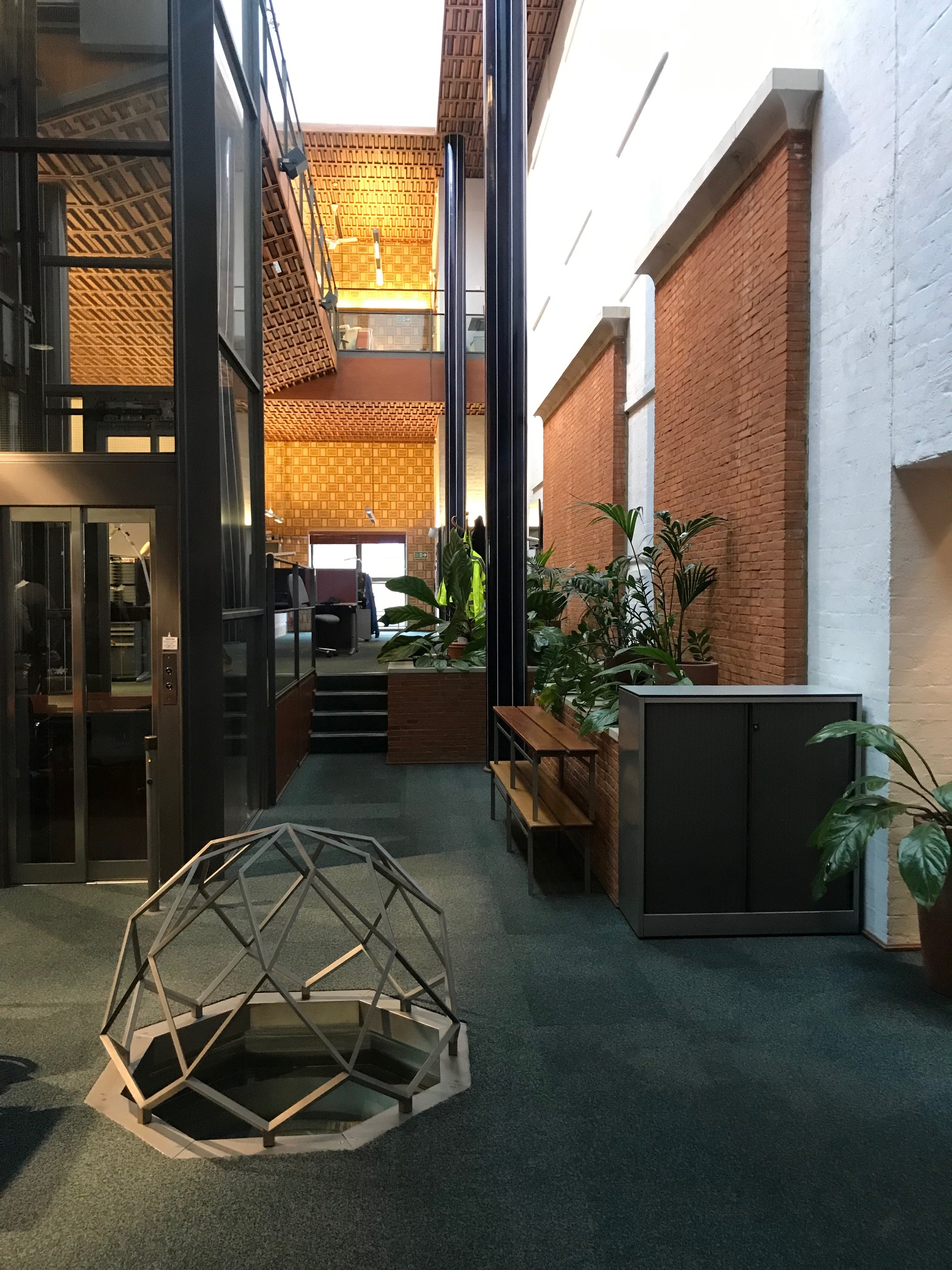
The inside of the CCDC headquarters Cambridge, UK

The CSD is a widely used repository for small-molecule organic and metal-organic crystal structures for scientists. Structures deposited with Cambridge Crystallographic Data Centre (CCDC) are publicly available for download at the point of publication or at consent from the depositor. They are also scientifically enriched and included in the database used by software offered by the centre. Targeted subsets of the CSD are also freely available to support teaching and other activities.

== History ==
The CCDC grew out of the activities of the crystallography group led by Olga Kennard OBE FRS in the Department of Organic, Inorganic and Theoretical Chemistry of the University of Cambridge. From 1965, the group began to collect published bibliographic, chemical and crystal structure data for all small molecules studied by X-ray or neutron diffraction. With the rapid developments in computing taking place at this time, this collection was encoded in electronic form and became known as the Cambridge Structural Database (CSD).

The CSD was one of the first numerical scientific databases to begin operations anywhere in the world, and received academic grants from the UK Office for Scientific and Technical Information and then from the UK Science and Engineering Research Council. These funds, together with subventions from National Affiliated Centres, enabled the development of the CSD and its associated software during the 1970s and 1980s. The first releases of the CSD System to the United States, Italy and Japan occurred in the early 1970s. By the early 1980s the CSD System was being distributed in more than 30 countries. As of 2014, the CSD System was distributed to academics in 70 countries.

During the 1980s, interest in the CSD System from pharmaceutical and agrochemicals companies increased significantly. This led to the establishment of the Cambridge Crystallographic Data Centre (CCDC) as an independent company in 1987, with the legal status of a non-profit charitable institution, and with its operations overseen by an international board of governors. The CCDC moved into purpose-built premises on the site of the University Department of Chemistry in 1992.

Kennard retired as Director in 1997 and was succeeded by David Hartley (1997–2002) and Frank Allen (2002–2008). Colin Groom was appointed as executive director from 1 October 2008 to September 2017. And most recently, Juergen Harter was appointed CEO in June 2018.

CCDC software products diversified to the use of crystallographic data in applications in the life sciences and crystallography. Much of this software development and marketing is carried out by CCDC Software Limited (founded in 1998), a wholly owned subsidiary which covenants all of its profits back to the CCDC.

Although the CCDC is a self-administering organization, it retains close links with the University of Cambridge, and is a University Partner Institution that is qualified to train postgraduate students for higher degrees (PhD, MPhil).

The CCDC established US applications and support operations in the US in October 2013, initially at Rutgers, the State University of New Jersey, where it is co-located with the RCSB Protein Data Bank

== Contents ==
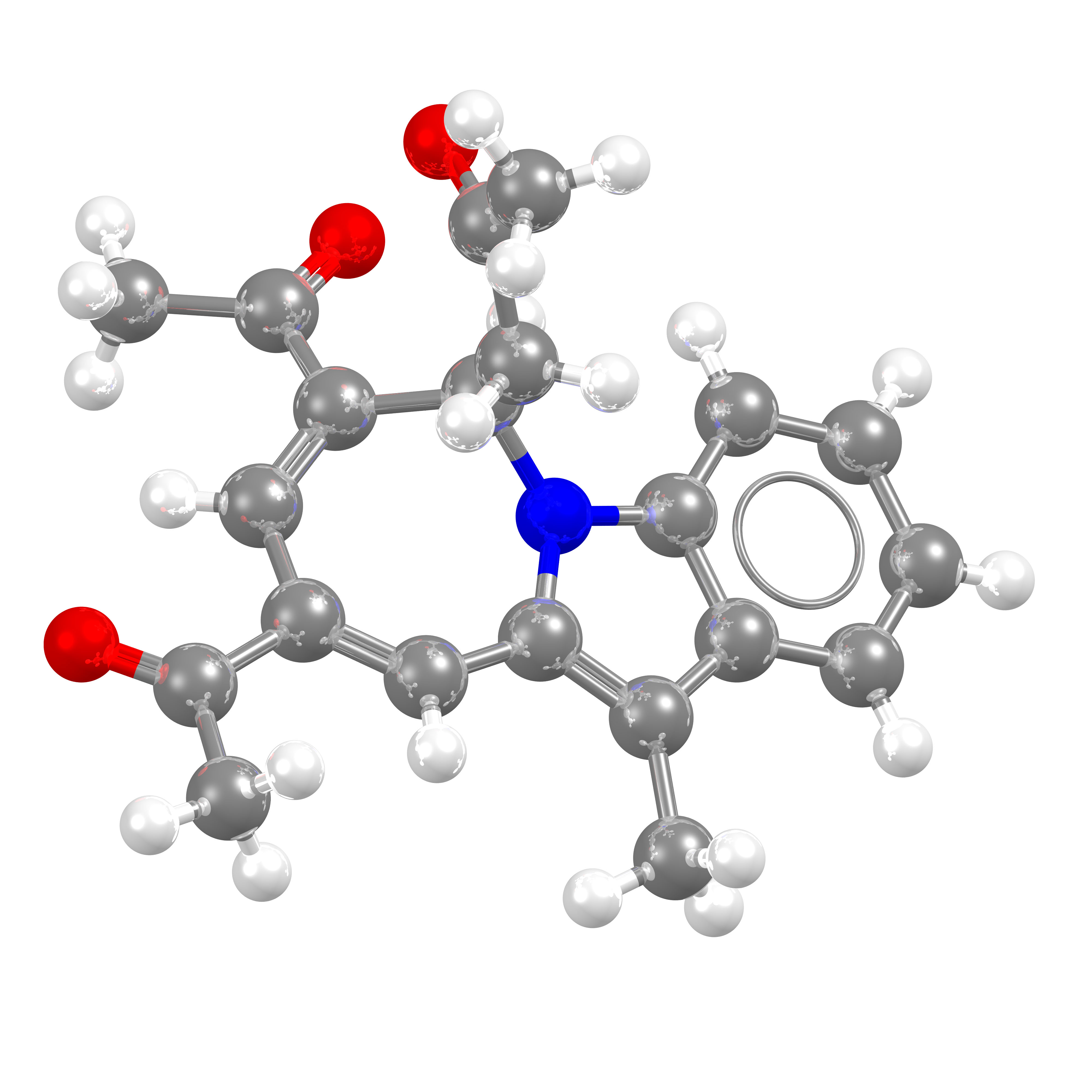
One millionth structure added to CSD, CSD ID: XOPCAJ

The CSD is updated with about 50,000 new structures each year and with improvements to existing entries. Entries (structures) in the repository are released for public access as soon as the corresponding entry has appeared in the peer-reviewed scientific literature. Meanwhile, data can also be deposited and published directly through the CSD without an accompanying scientific article as what is known as a CSD Communication.

Periodically, general statistics about the breadth of CSD holdings are reported, for example the January 2014 report. As of January 2019, the summary statistics are as follows:

| Query | structures | % of CSD |
|---|---|---|
| Total # of structures | 995,907 | 100.0 |
| # of different compounds | 900,984 | – |
| # of literature sources | 2,004 | – |
| Organic structures | 431,037 | 43.5 |
| Transition metal present | 478,138 | 48.2 |
| alkali or alkaline earth metal present | 48,056 | 4.8 |
| main-group metal present | 101,948 | 10.3 |
| 3D coordinates present | 937,809 | 94.6 |
| Error-free coordinates | 926,422 | 98.81 |
| Neutron studies | 2,142 | 0.2 |
| Powder diffraction studies | 4,761 | 0.5 |
| Low/high-temp. studies | 503,368 | 50.8 |
| Absolute configuration determined | 28,834 | 2.9 |
| Disorder present in structure | 256,019 | 25.8 |
| Polymorphic structures | 29,817 | 3.0 |
| R-factor < 0.100 | 935,419 | 94.4 |
| R-factor < 0.075 | 845,708 | 85.3 |
| R-factor < 0.050 | 553,042 | 55.8 |
| R-factor < 0.030 | 121,806 | 12.3 |
| No. of atoms with 3D coordinates | 85,791,623 | – |

As of January 2019, the top 25 scientific journals in terms of publication of structures in the CSD repository were:

1. 73,070 structures were reported in Inorg. Chem.
2. 62,072 structures were reported in Dalton & J. Chem. Soc., Dalton Trans.
3. 54,160 structures were reported in Organometallics
4. 48,967 structures were reported in J. Am. Chem. Soc.
5. 42,422 structures were reported in Acta Crystallogr. Sect. E
6. 32,610 structures were reported in Chem. Eur. J.
7. 29,790 structures were reported in J. Organomet. Chem.
8. 29,640 structures were reported in Angew. Chem. Int. Ed.
9. 28,682 structures were reported in Inorg. Chim. Acta
10. 28,351 structures were reported in Chem. Commun. & J. Chem. Soc.
11. 27,328 structures were reported in CSD Communications
12. 26,774 structures were reported in Acta Crystallogr. Sect. C
13. 26,734 structures were reported in Polyhedron
14. 24,045 structures were reported in Eur. J. Inorg. Chem.
15. 23,483 structures were reported in J. Org. Chem.
16. 22,286 structures were reported in Cryst. Growth Des.
17. 22,011 structures were reported in CrystEngComm
18. 15,985 structures were reported in Organic Letters
19. 15,424 structures were reported in Z. Anorg. Allg. Chem.
20. 14,864 structures were reported in Acta Crystallogr. Sect. B
21. 13,909 structures were reported in Tetrahedron 8,597 structures were reported as Private Communication to the CSD
22. 12,734 structures were reported in J. Mol. Struct.
23. 11,234 structures were reported in Tetrahedron Lett.
24. 9,150 structures were reported in Eur. J. Org. Chem.
25. 8,789 structures were reported in New Journal of Chemistry

These 25 journals account for 704,541 of the 996,193 or 70.7% of the structures in the CSD.

These data show that most structures are determined by X-ray diffraction, with less than 1% of structures being determined by neutron diffraction or powder diffraction. The number of error-free coordinates were taken as a percentage of structures for which 3D coordinates are present in the CSD.

The significance of the structure factor files, mentioned above, is that, for CSD structures determined by X-ray diffraction that have a structure file, a crystallographer can verify the interpretation of the observed measurements.

== Growth trend ==
Historically, the number of structures in the CSD has grown at an approximately exponential rate passing the 25,000 structures milestone in 1977, the 50,000 structures milestone in 1983, the 125,000 structures milestone in 1992, the 250,000 structures milestone in 2001, the 500,000 structures milestone in 2009, and the 1,000,000 structures milestone on June 8, 2019. The one millionth structure added to CSD is the crystal structure of 1-(7,9-diacetyl-11-methyl-6H-azepino[1,2-a]indol-6-yl)propan-2-one.

Growth trend of structure in CSD from 1965 to 2018

Number of published structures per year
| Year | # published | Total |
|---|---|---|
| 2018 | 53429 | 974,653 |
| 2017 | 55031 | 921,224 |
| 2016 | 54975 | 866,193 |
| 2015 | 53610 | 811,218 |
| 2014 | 50759 | 757,608 |
| 2013 | 48025 | 706,849 |
| 2012 | 45199 | 661,121 |
| 2011 | 43882 | 615,922 |
| 2010 | 41240 | 572,040 |
| 2009 | 40627 | 530,800 |
| 2008 | 36802 | 490,173 |
| 2007 | 36569 | 453,371 |
| 2006 | 34713 | 416,802 |
| 2005 | 31733 | 382,089 |
| 2004 | 27988 | 350,356 |
| 2003 | 26287 | 322,368 |
| 2002 | 24306 | 296,081 |
| 2001 | 21781 | 271,775 |
| 2000 | 19998 | 249,994 |
| 1999 | 18780 | 229,996 |
| 1998 | 17289 | 211,216 |
| 1997 | 15896 | 193,927 |
| 1996 | 15487 | 178,031 |
| 1995 | 13001 | 162,544 |
| 1994 | 12290 | 149,543 |
| 1993 | 12032 | 137,253 |
| 1992 | 10691 | 125,221 |
| 1991 | 9941 | 114,530 |
| 1990 | 8935 | 104,589 |
| 1989 | 7750 | 95,654 |
| 1988 | 7644 | 87,904 |
| 1987 | 7472 | 80,260 |
| 1986 | 6873 | 72,788 |
| 1985 | 6911 | 65,915 |
| 1984 | 6511 | 59,004 |
| 1983 | 5250 | 52,493 |
| 1982 | 5233 | 47,243 |
| 1981 | 4666 | 42,010 |
| 1980 | 4252 | 37,344 |
| 1979 | 3876 | 33,092 |
| 1978 | 3415 | 29,216 |
| 1977 | 3092 | 25,801 |
| 1976 | 2735 | 22,709 |
| 1975 | 2171 | 19,974 |
| 1974 | 2142 | 17,803 |
| 1973 | 1991 | 15,661 |
| 1972 | 1969 | 13,670 |
| 1971 | 1548 | 11,701 |
| 1970 | 1261 | 10,153 |
| 1969 | 1130 | 8,892 |
| 1968 | 975 | 7,762 |
| 1967 | 936 | 6,787 |
| 1966 | 683 | 5,851 |
| 1965 | 656 | 5,168 |
| 1923–1964 | 4512 | 4,512 |

Note: data for 1923–1964 are aggregated together in the last line of the table.

== File format ==
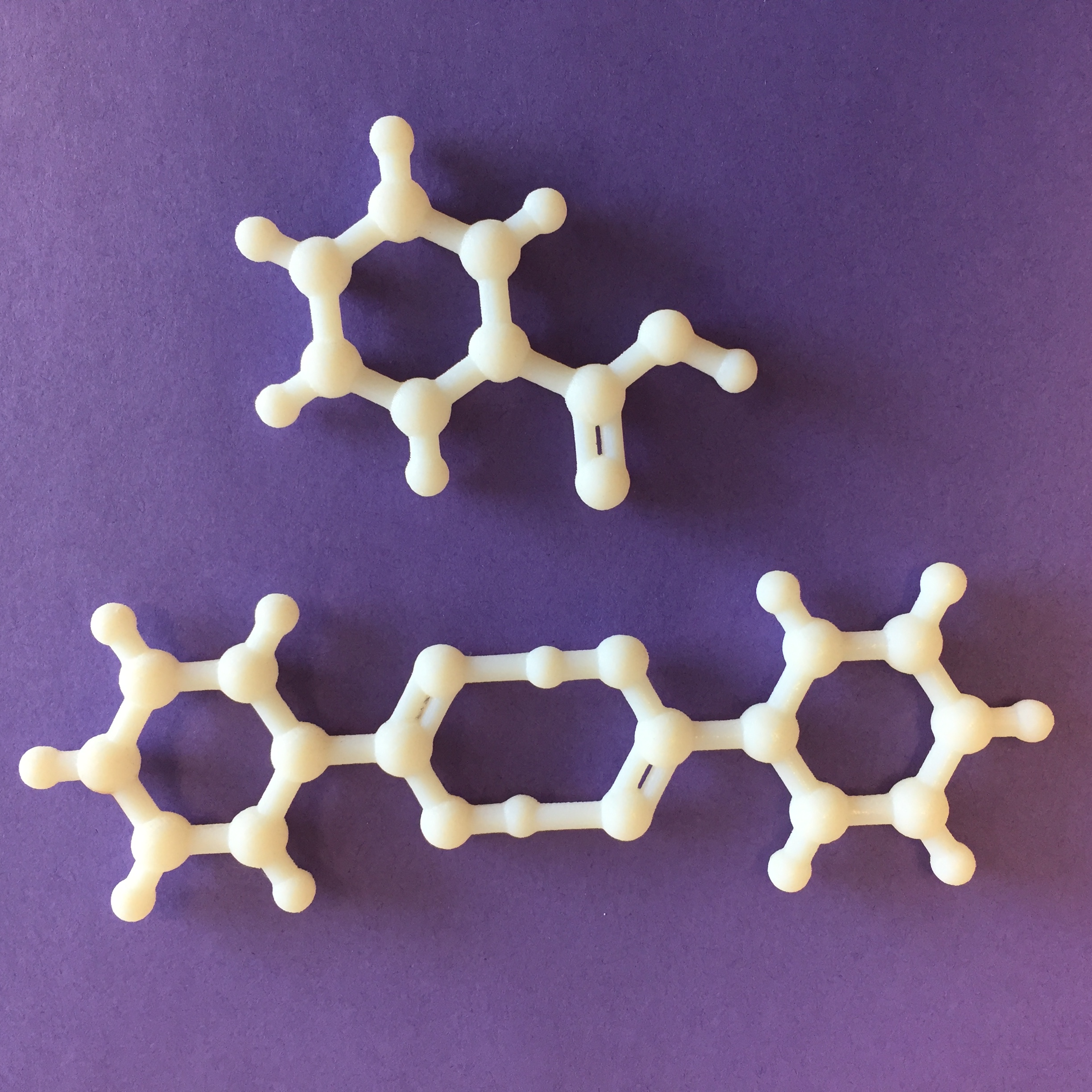
3D-printed model of benzoic acid, taken from a crystal structure determination, created using coordinates from the Cambridge Structural Database and via the CCDC program Mercury. The top model shows a single molecule of benzoic acid. The bottom model shows a hydrogen-bonded dimer.

The primary file format for CSD structure deposition, adopted around 1991, is the "Crystallographic Information file" format, CIF.

The deposited CSD files can be downloaded in the CIF format. The validated and curated CSD files can be exported in a wide range of formats, including CIF, MOL, Mol2, PDB, SHELX and XMol, using tools in the CSD System.

The CCDC uses two different codes to distinguish between the deposited dataset and the curated CSD entry. For example, one specific "CSD Communication" of an organic molecule was deposited with the CCDC and assigned the deposition number "CCDC-991327". This allows free public access to the data as deposited. From the deposited data, selected information is extracted to prepare the validated and curated CSD entry which was assigned the refcode "MITGUT". As a part of the curation process, CCDC also applies an algorithm, DeCIFer, to help the editors assign chemistry to structures when those representations (e.g. bond types and charge assignments etc.) are missing from the original CIF files submitted. The validated and curated entry is included in the CSD System and WebCSD distributions, with availability restricted to those making appropriate contributions.

== Viewing the data ==
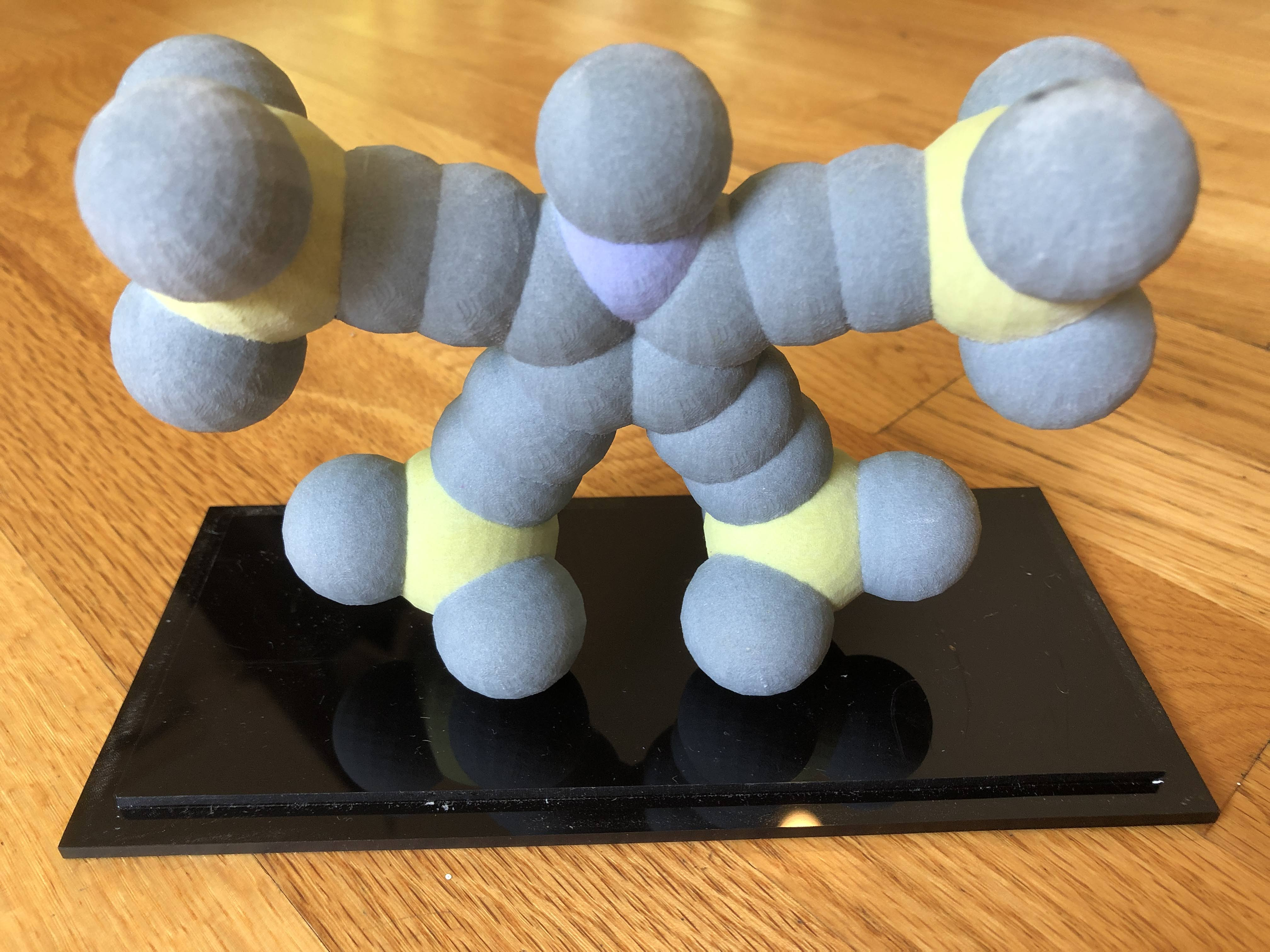
3D printed model of 1-methyl-2,3,4,5-tetrakis((trimethylsilyl)ethynyl)-1H-pyrrole

Each data set in CSD can be openly viewed and retrieved using the free Access Structure service. Through this web-browser-based service, users can view the data set in 2D and 3D, obtain some basic information about the structure, and download the deposited data set. More advanced search functions and curated information are available through the subscription-based CSD system.

Besides using the CSD system, the structure files may be viewed using one of several open-source computer programs such as Jmol. Some other free, but not open-source programs include MDL Chime, PyMOL, UCSF Chimera, RasMol, WINGX, the CCDC provides a free version of its visualization program Mercury.

Starting from 2015, Mercury from CCDC also provides the functionality to generate 3D-print-ready file from structures in CSD.

== See also ==
- Crystallographic database
- Inorganic Crystal Structure Database (ICSD)
- Crystallography Open Database (COD)
- Mercury
- Protein structure
