= Beta-lactamase inhibitor protein =

Beta-Lactamase Inhibitor Protein
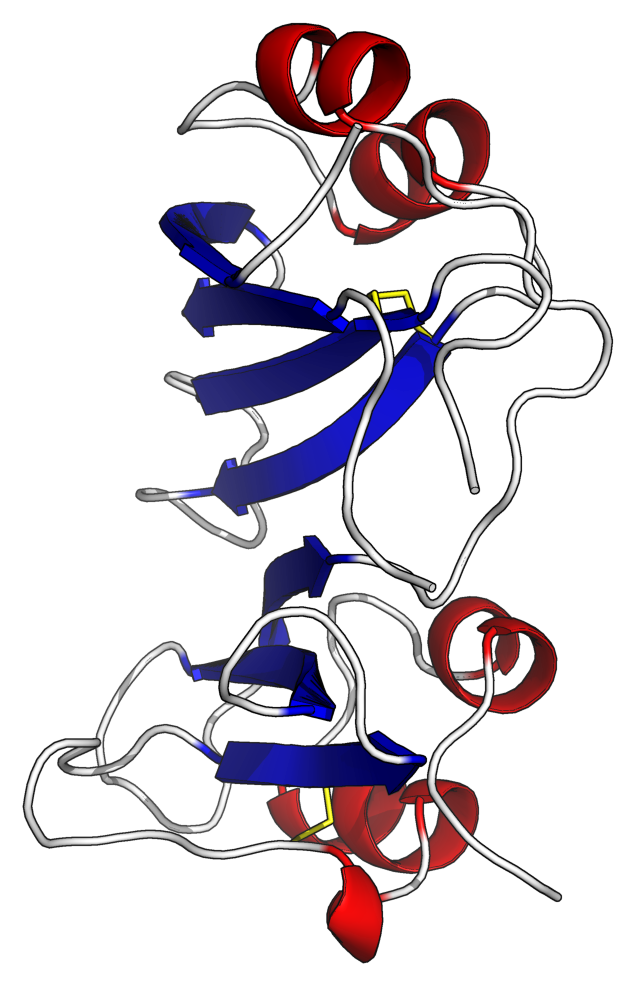
- Beta-Lactamase Inhibitory Protein (BLIP) with α-helices in red, β-sheets in blue, disulphides in yellow. (PDB: 3C7V)

Identifiers
- Symbol: BLIP
- Pfam: PF07467
- Pfam clan: CL0320
- InterPro: IPR009099
- SCOP2: 1s0w / SCOPe / SUPFAM
Available protein structures:
- PDB: IPR009099 PF07467 (ECOD; PDBsum)
- AlphaFold: IPR009099; PF07467

Beta-lactamase inhibitor proteins (BLIPs) are a family of proteins produced by bacterial species including Streptomyces. BLIP acts as a potent inhibitor of beta-lactamases such as TEM-1, which is the most widespread resistance enzyme to penicillin antibiotics. BLIP binds competitively the surface of TEM-1 and inserting residues into the active site to make direct contacts with catalytic residues. BLIP is able to inhibit a variety of class A beta-lactamases, possibly through flexibility of its two domains. The two tandemly repeated domains of BLIP have an α_{2}-β_{4} structure, the β-hairpin loop from domain 1 inserting into the active site of beta-lactamase. BLIP shows no sequence similarity with BLIP-II, even though both bind to and inhibit TEM-1.

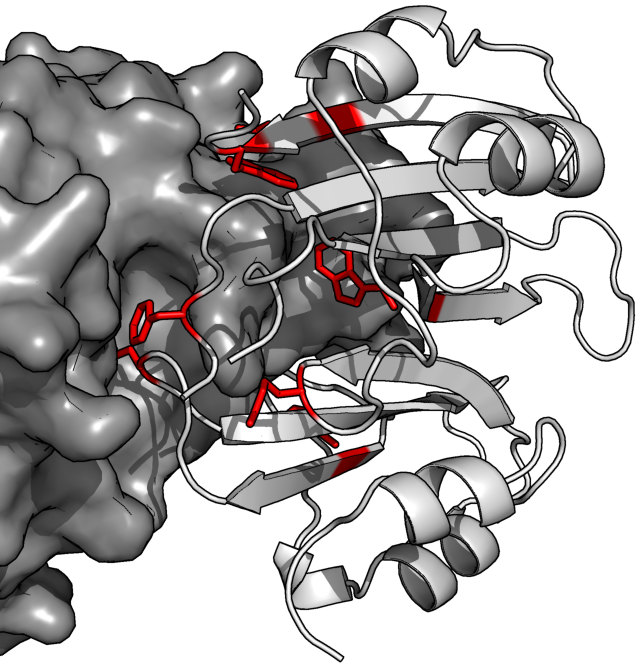
Beta-lactamase Inhibitory Protein (white) complexed with beta-lactamase (grey) with key interaction residues highlighted (red). (PDB: 3C7V)
