= Crystallographic Information File =

File format for crystallographic data

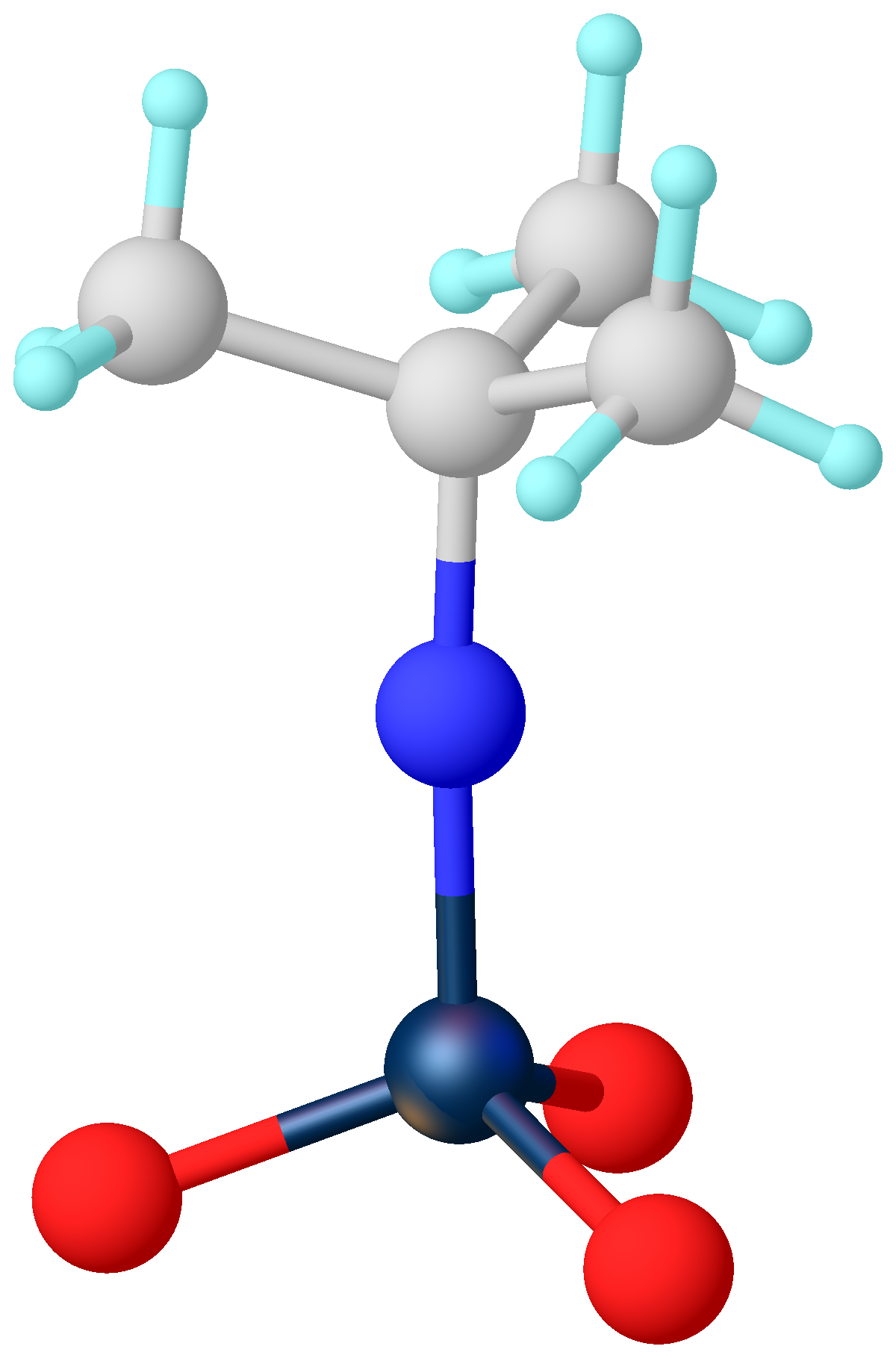
- Filename extension: .cif
- Internet media type: chemical/x-cif
- Developed by: International Union of Crystallography (IUCr)
- Type of format: chemical file format
- Extended from: Self-defining Text Archive and Retrieval
- Extended to: mmCIF
- Website: www.iucr.org/resources/cif

Crystallographic Information File (CIF) is a standard text file format for representing crystallographic information, promulgated by the International Union of Crystallography (IUCr). CIF was developed by the IUCr Working Party on Crystallographic Information in an effort sponsored by the IUCr Commission on Crystallographic Data and the IUCr Commission on Journals. The file format was initially published by Hall, Allen, and Brown and has since been revised, most recently versions 1.1 and 2.0. Full specifications for the format are available at the IUCr website. Many computer programs for molecular viewing are compatible with this format, including Jmol.

== mmCIF ==
Closely related is mmCIF, macromolecular CIF, which is intended as a successor to the Protein Data Bank (PDB) format. It is now the default format used by the Protein Data Bank.

Also closely related is Crystallographic Information Framework, a broader system of exchange protocols based on data dictionaries and relational rules expressible in different machine-readable manifestations, including, but not restricted to, Crystallographic Information File and XML.
