= Inorganic Crystal Structure Database =

Chemical database with inorganic structures

Inorganic Crystal Structure Database (ICSD) is a chemical database founded in 1978 by Günter Bergerhoff at the University of Bonn in Germany and I. D. Brown at McMaster University in Canada. It is now produced by FIZ Karlsruhe in Europe and the U.S. National Institute of Standards and Technology. It seeks to contain information on all inorganic crystal structures published since 1913, including pure elements, minerals, metals, and intermetallic compounds (with atomic coordinates). ICSD contains over 318,000 entries as of August 2025 and is updated twice a year.

A Windows-based PC version has been developed in co-operation with the National Institute of Standards and Technology (NIST), and a PHP-MySQL web based version in co-operation with the Institut Laue–Langevin (ILL) Grenoble.

== See also ==
- Crystallographic database
- Cambridge Structural Database (CSD) maintained by the Cambridge Crystallographic Data Centre (CCDC)
- Crystallography Open Database (COD)
