= International Union of Crystallography =

Association of professional crystallographers

- Abbreviation: IUCr
- Formation: 1948; 78 years ago
- Type: INGO
- Region served: Worldwide
- Official language: English
- Parent organization: International Science Council
- Website: www.iucr.org

The International Union of Crystallography (IUCr) is an organisation devoted to the international promotion and coordination of the science of crystallography. The IUCr is a member of the International Science Council (ISC).

== Objectives ==
The objectives of the IUCr are to promote international cooperation in crystallography and to contribute to all aspects of crystallography, to promote international publication of crystallographic research, to facilitate standardization of methods, units, nomenclatures and symbols, and to form a focus for the relations of crystallography to other sciences.

The IUCr fulfils these objectives by publishing in print and electronically primary scientific journals through the Acta Crystallographica journal series, as well as Journal of Applied Crystallography, Journal of Synchrotron Radiation, IUCrJ, the series of reference volumes International Tables for Crystallography, distributing the quarterly IUCr Newsletter, maintaining the online World Directory/Database of Crystallographers, awarding the Ewald Prize and organising the triennial Congress and General Assembly.

== History ==
In 1944 the yearly meeting of the X-ray Analysis Group (XRAG) of the UK Institute of Physics was held in Oxford, and the distinguished German crystallographer Paul Peter Ewald, who then taught at Queen's University Belfast, was invited to give the evening lecture. In it he gave a historical survey of some of the stages in the evolution of X-ray crystallography and ended with a strong plea for the formation of an international society or union which would represent, and unify publication for, the new science. This idea was followed up by the British crystallographers, and particularly by Sir Lawrence Bragg, the Chairman of XRAG. In June 1946, within a year of the termination of fighting in WWII, he arranged for an international meeting of crystallographers in London which was attended by some 120 scientists from most of the allied countries. In that London meeting Ewald was elected Chairman of the Provisional International Crystallographic Committee, which put into action the decision to form the International Union of Crystallography.

== Presidents ==
Sir Lawrence Bragg was the first formally elected President of the IUCr, with Ralph Walter Graystone Wyckoff and Arne Westgren as Vice-Presidents. Ewald was elected as 5th President of the IUCr, the 'international society or union' that he had originally conceived, in 1960.

- 1948 – Lawrence Bragg
- 1951 – Johannes Martin Bijvoet
- 1954 – Ralph Wyckoff
- 1957 – Jean Wyart
- 1960 – Paul Peter Ewald
- 1963 – John Desmond Bernal
- 1966 – Kathleen Lonsdale, Nikolay Belov
- 1969 – André Guinier
- 1972 – Dorothy Hodgkin
- 1975 – Arne Magnéli
- 1978 – Norio Kato
- 1981 – Jerome Karle
- 1984 – Theo Hahn
- 1987 – Mario Nardelli
- 1990 – André Authier
- 1993 – Philip Coppens
- 1996 – Edward Neill Baker
- 1999 – Henk Schenk
- 2002 – William L. Duax
- 2005 – Yuji Ohashi
- 2008 – Sine Larsen
- 2011 – Gautam Radhakrishna Desiraju
- 2014 – Marvin L. Hackert
- 2017 – Sven Lidin
- 2021 – Hanna Dabkowska
- 2023 – Santiago García Granda

== IUCr Symmetry notation ==
The IUCr notation is the notation for the symmetry group adopted by the International Union of Crystallography in 1952. It identifies members of the Wallpaper group with a 4 character name. First it has a P or C for primitive or centered groups. Groups are denoted by a number 1, 2, 3, 4, or 6 for the highest order of symmetry. Groups can have one or two reflections, denoted as vertical mirrors first (horizontal reflection), and horizontal second (vertical reflection). A simple reflection is denoted by an m (mirror), and a glide-reflection is denoted by a g. Place holder 1 denotes an orthogonal direction with no reflections.

== See also ==
- Acta Crystallographica
- X-ray crystallography
- Crystallography
- International Year of Crystallography
- Open Access Scholarly Publishers Association, of which IUCr is a member
- British Crystallographic Association
- American Crystallographic Association
- German Crystallographic Society
- French Crystallographic Association
- Crystallographic Society of Japan
