= Lawrence Bartell =

American chemist

Lawrence Sims Bartell
- Born: February 23, 1923; Ann Arbor, Michigan
- Died: September 8, 2017 (aged 94); Ann Arbor, Michigan
- Education: University of Michigan
- Scientific career
- Fields: Physical chemistry
- Workplaces: Iowa State University, University of Michigan
- Doctoral advisor: Lawrence Brockway

Lawrence Sims Bartell (23 February 1923, Ann Arbor, Michigan – 8 September 2017, Ann Arbor) was the Philip J. Elving Professor Emeritus of Chemistry at the University of Michigan. His research in physical chemistry focused on electron diffraction studies of molecular structure and later on molecular mechanics. Bartell retired from his faculty position at Michigan in 1993.

== Early life and education ==
Bartell was born on February 23, 1923, in Ann Arbor, Michigan, the son of noted University of Michigan chemistry professor Floyd Bartell. The younger Bartell briefly attended the University of North Carolina as an undergraduate before returning to complete his studies at the University of Michigan, from which he received his B.S. in 1944. As he later recalled, before he had finished his studies he was invited by Glenn Seaborg to interview for a position working on the Manhattan Project. He accepted the job and worked on methods for extracting plutonium from uranium. He was subsequently drafted into the Navy and served for nine months before being discharged for disability due to rheumatic fever. He subsequently returned to the University of Michigan and received his Ph.D. in 1953 under the supervision of Lawrence Brockway.

== Academic career ==
Bartell began his academic career at Iowa State University, where he joined the faculty in 1953. He moved to the University of Michigan in 1965, where he would remain until his retirement in 1993. He was named the Philip J. Elving Professor of Chemistry in 1987. Bartell chaired the Division of Chemical Physics of the American Physical Society from 1977 to 1978 and served on the editorial boards of several scientific journals specializing in chemical physics. A type of electron microscope used by his research group was noted by the Guinness Book of World Records in the 1970s as most powerful in the world at the time.

After his retirement, Bartell has written several memoirs, including a paper describing his experiences working on the Manhattan Project and a self-published book called True Stories of Strange Events and Odd People: A Memoir. Bartell died in September 2017.

== Awards and honors ==
- Fellow, American Physical Society, 1968
- University of Michigan Distinguished Faculty Achievement Award, 1981
- Michigan Association Governing Boards Distinguished Faculty Award, 1982
- National Science Foundation Creativity Award, 1982
- Michigan Scientist of the Year, 1986
