= Floyd Bartell =

Floyd Earl Bartell
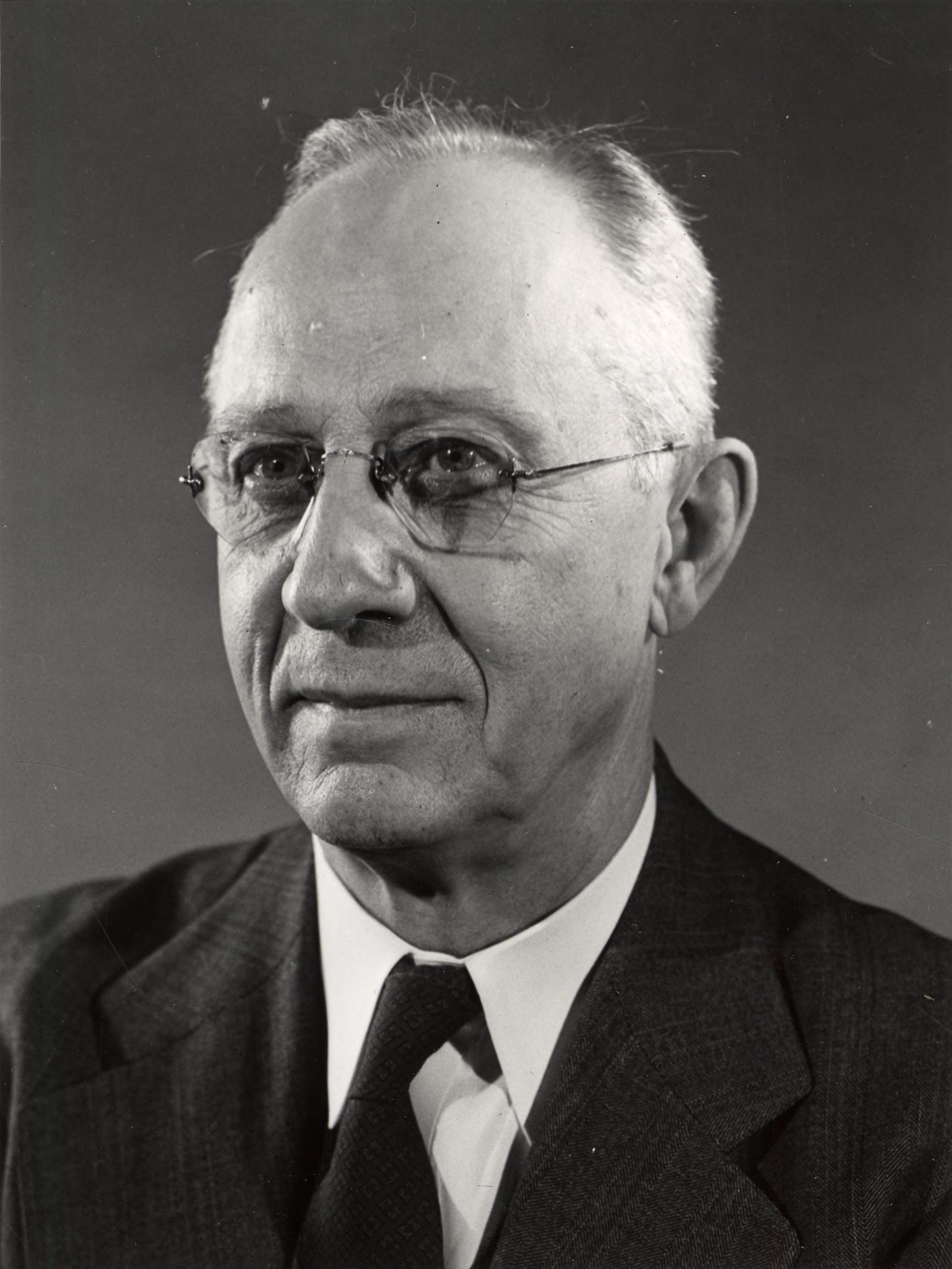
- Born: June 16, 1883; Concord, Michigan
- Died: March 5, 1961 (aged 77)
- Education: Albion College (A.B.), University of Michigan (Ph.D.)
- Scientific career
- Fields: Colloid chemistry
- Workplaces: University of Michigan
- Thesis: (1910)

Floyd Earl Bartell (1883-1961) was a chemist who spent his entire academic career at the University of Michigan. He specialized in the study of colloids.

== Early life and education ==
Bartell was born on June 16, 1883, in Concord, Michigan. He was an undergraduate at Albion College and graduated in 1905. After a short period as an instructor of chemistry at Simpson College in Indianola, Iowa, Bartell returned to Michigan and began graduate studies in chemistry at the University of Michigan. He received his Ph.D. in 1910.

== Academic career ==
After finishing his Ph.D., Bartell remained at the University of Michigan as faculty, reaching full professorship in 1924. Bartell's research and teaching were focused on colloid chemistry and included the development of one of the first courses on the topic in United States universities, first offered in 1913. This course led to the publication of widely used and well-regarded laboratory manual in colloid chemistry. Among those undergraduate chemistry students recruited to assist with Bartell's courses was future biochemist Albert Baird Hastings. Bartell served on several university administrative committees, co-organized conferences on colloid chemistry, and co-organized the American Chemical Society's Colloid Division in 1926. The ACS recognized him for his career achievements with the award of its Kendall Award in Colloid Chemistry in 1959.

Bartell's research work had military applications and he was involved in war efforts throughout his career, serving as a captain in the Army's Nitrate Division starting during World War I and as a consultant to what was then the War Department starting in the 1920s. During World War II he was recognized for materials science advances in developing a water- and heat-resistant fabric treatment called "aerobond", for which he received funding from the Office of Scientific Research and Development in 1944 and which was proposed in 1946 for further development for peacetime applications.

Bartell retired from his faculty position, assuming professor emeritus status, in 1953, though he continued to advise Ph.D. students after his official retirement.

== Personal life ==
Bartell and his wife married in 1921 and had two children. Their daughter died young in 1946; their son Lawrence Bartell eventually became a noted professor of chemistry in his own right, serving on the faculty of Iowa State University and later as the Philip J. Elving Professor of Physical Chemistry at the University of Michigan. Floyd Bartell died on March 5, 1961.
