= Isabella Karle =

American physical chemist (1921–2017)

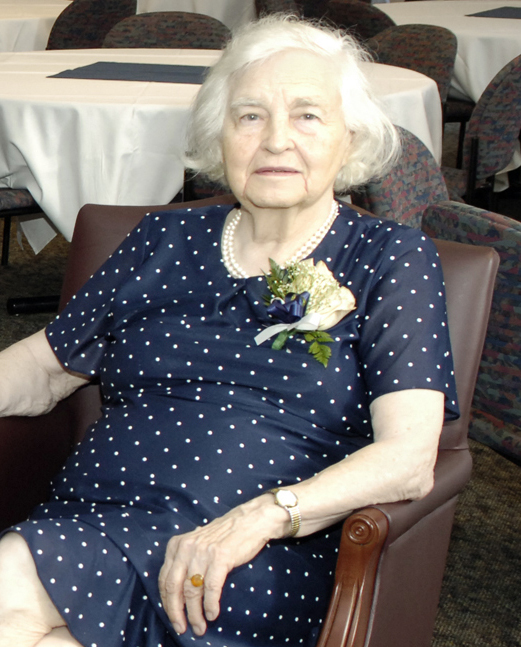
- Karle at her retirement in 2009
- Born: Isabella Helen Lugoski; December 2, 1921; Detroit, Michigan, U.S.
- Died: October 3, 2017 (aged 95); Alexandria, Virginia, U.S.
- Resting place: Columbia Gardens Cemetery; Arlington, Virginia, U.S.
- Education: University of Michigan, BS, MS, PhD
- Known for: X-ray scattering technique to study biological, chemical, metallurgical, and physical characteristics of crystals
- Spouse: Jerome Karle (m. 1942)
- Children: 3
- Awards: National Medal of Science, Achievement award Society of Women Engineers, Garvan–Olin Medal, Gregori Aminoff Prize, Bower Award
- Scientific career
- Fields: Crystallography
- Doctoral advisor: Lawrence O. Brockway

Isabella Helen Karle (née Lugoski; December 2, 1921 – October 3, 2017) was an American chemist who revolutionized crystallography laying the foundation for three-dimensional structures of molecules which facilitates the study of the biological, chemical, metallurgical, and physical characteristics of the molecules. This information provides the ability to synthesize those molecules. Her method improved the speed and accuracy of chemical and biomedical analysis and enabled the development of new pharmaceutical products and other synthesized materials.

For her scientific work, Karle received the National Medal of Science from President Clinton in 1995 "for the development and application of a method for determining essentially equal-atom crystal and molecular structures by x-ray analysis, thereby having a profound effect on the practice of organic and biological chemistry". She received several honorary doctorates and the Navy Distinguished Civilian Service Award (which is the Navy's highest form of recognition to civilian employees).

== Early life and education ==
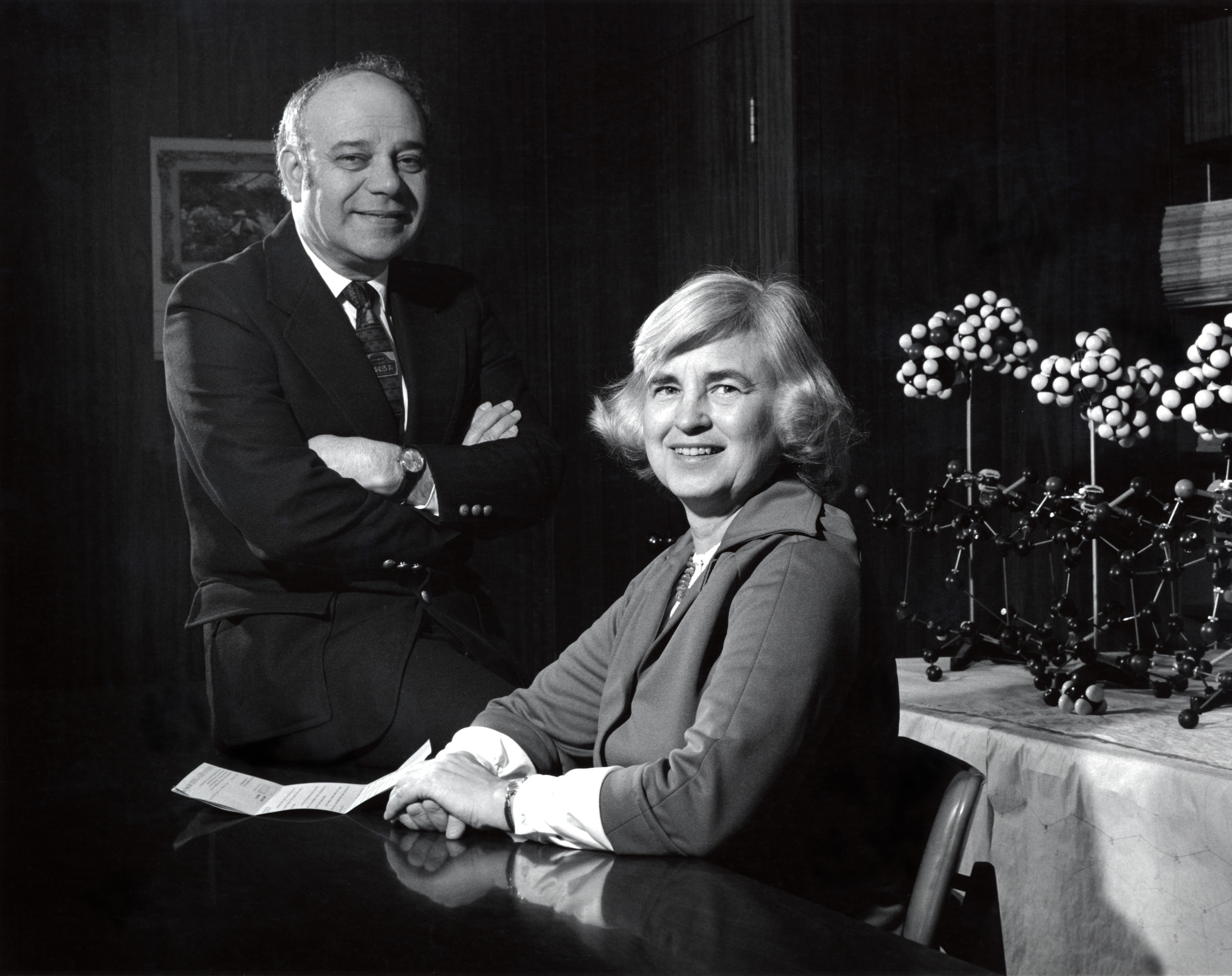
Isabella (seated) and Jerome Karle at the U.S. Naval Research Laboratory, where they worked for many years.

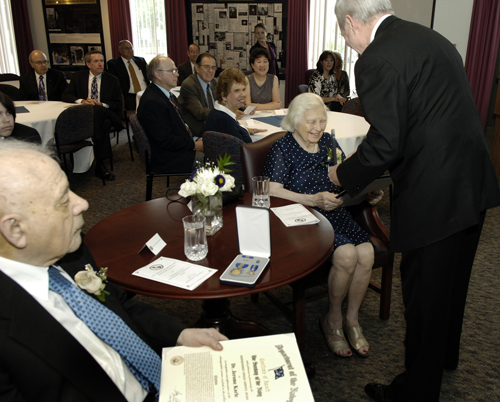
Isabella (seated center) and Jerome Karle (left foreground) at their 2009 retirement ceremony

Isabella Helen Lugoski was born in Detroit, Michigan, on December 2, 1921, the daughter of immigrants from Poland. Her father, Zygmunt Lugoski, worked for the city's transportation system. Her mother, the former Elizabeth Graczyk, was a self-educated woman who supported her family as a seamstress of automobile upholstery and later by running a restaurant–eventually with Isabella's help, who became the restaurant's accountant after discovering a love for numbers.

Karle attended the local public schools and skipped two grades in elementary school, despite not speaking English until the first grade. While at school, a female chemistry teacher led her to her pursuit of the field as a career. She also drew inspiration from a biography of Marie Curie.

Karle attended Wayne University (now Wayne State University) in Detroit for a semester before obtaining a four-year scholarship to the University of Michigan, where she majored in physical chemistry and received a Bachelor of Science at age 19, followed by Master of Science and Ph.D. degrees in the field.

During her graduate work she met her future husband and scientific collaborator, Jerome Karle, in a physical-chemistry lab where alphabetical seating dictated that the two of them would sit next to each other; the two were both advised in their Ph.D. studies by Lawrence Brockway.

== Career ==
Karle worked on the Manhattan Project during World War II, where she developed techniques to extract plutonium chloride from a mixture containing plutonium oxide. After the war, she worked at the University of Michigan as a member of the chemistry faculty.

She then joined the United States Naval Research Laboratory (NRL). At the NRL, her husband Jerome developed "direct methods" for analyzing structure of crystals. Their experimental apparatus for electron diffraction for characterizing the structures of gaseous molecules provided invaluable insights into key principles that led them later to their successful treatment of the phase problem in X-ray crystallography. However, for many years the crystallographic community remained skeptical about their utility. Isabella Karle was the first person to apply the method. She developed the symbolic addition procedure that connects the theoretical "direct method" apparatus and actual X-ray diffraction data. These contributions advanced the field of X-ray crystallography by enabling determination of the structure of crystals.

One of the first successes of solving crystal structures was determining the structure of the venom of a South American frog. Understanding the mechanism used by the venom to block specific nerve transmission proved to be very useful for the study of nerve transmission for medical purposes. Based on her work, a synthetic form of the venom could be manufactured. This technique has played a major role in the development of new pharmaceutical products and other synthesized materials.

=== Nobel prize controversy ===
In 1985, Jerome Karle was awarded the Nobel Prize in Chemistry, together with mathematician Herbert A. Hauptman, for developing direct methods for analyzing X-ray diffraction data. The Nobel Committee ignored Isabella's crucial role in solving the problem in practice, and Jerome Karle and many other members of the crystallography community strongly believed that Isabella Karle should have shared the prize.

Karle was the first to publish the structures of many important molecules. As her successes became known, Isabella brought young women into her laboratory and taught them crystallography. And, as her fame for solving the structures of many difficult crystals spread throughout the community, collaborators across the world sent her samples of their crystals in glass vials. Her models of frog toxins are exhibited at the American Museum of Natural History in NYC.

=== Retirement ===
On July 31, 2009, Karle and her husband retired from the Naval Research Laboratory. Retirement ceremonies for the Karles were attended by United States Secretary of the Navy Ray Mabus, who presented the couple with the Department of the Navy Distinguished Civilian Service Award, the Navy's highest form of recognition to civilian employees. Over her career, Karle published nearly 300 scientific papers.

== Affiliations ==
Karle served as President of the American Crystallographic Association. She was a member of the American Physical Society and the American Chemical Society.

== Awards and honors ==
Karle received many honors and awards throughout her career. Karle was elected Fellow of the American Academy of Arts and Sciences and was elected to the American Philosophical Society in 1992. She received eight honorary doctorates and awards from the U.S. Navy (1993).

- 1968 Achievement Award from the Society of Women Engineers in "recognition of her significant contributions to the development of unique procedures for crystal structure analysis"
- 1976 Garvan–Olin Medal
- 1978 National Academy of Sciences
- 1980 Captain Robert Dexter Conrad Award
- 1988 Rear Admiral William S. Parsons Award
- 1988 Gregori Aminoff Prize, Royal Swedish Academy of Science
- 1989 Bijvoet Medal of the Bijvoet Center for Biomolecular Research
- 1993 Bower Award and Prize for the Advancement of Science, Franklin Institute “for determining three-dimensional structures of molecules with X-ray diffraction”
- 1995 National Medal of Science, received from President Clinton, “For the development and application of a method for determining essentially equal-atom crystal and molecular structures by x-ray analysis, thereby having a profound effect on the practice of organic and biological chemistry
- 2009 Navy Distinguished Civilian Service Award

== Legacy ==
Her x-ray scattering technique is used to study biological, chemical, metallurgical, and physical characteristics of crystals. It significantly improved the speed and accuracy of chemical and biomedical analysis and is still today the basis of all advanced x-ray crystallography including computerized programs used around the world. Her technique has played a major role in the development of new drugs and other synthesized materials.

Karle was the first female chemistry faculty member of the University of Michigan.

Karle was the first woman to receive the Bower Award for the Advancement of Science, Franklin Institute in 1993.

== Personal life ==
Karle married Jerome Karle in 1942 after completing her MS degree. They had three daughters, all of whom work in scientific fields: (1) Louise Karle, born 1946, is a theoretical chemist; (2) Jean Karle (1950) is an organic chemist; and (3) Madeleine Karle (1955) is a museum specialist with expertise in the field of geology.

Karle died on October 3, 2017, at a hospice in Alexandria, Virginia at 95 from a brain tumor. She was exposed to radiation during her work on the Manhattan project.

== See also ==
- List of nominees for the Nobel Prize in Physics
