= George N. Phillips =

American biochemist, researcher, and academic

George N. Phillips, Jr.
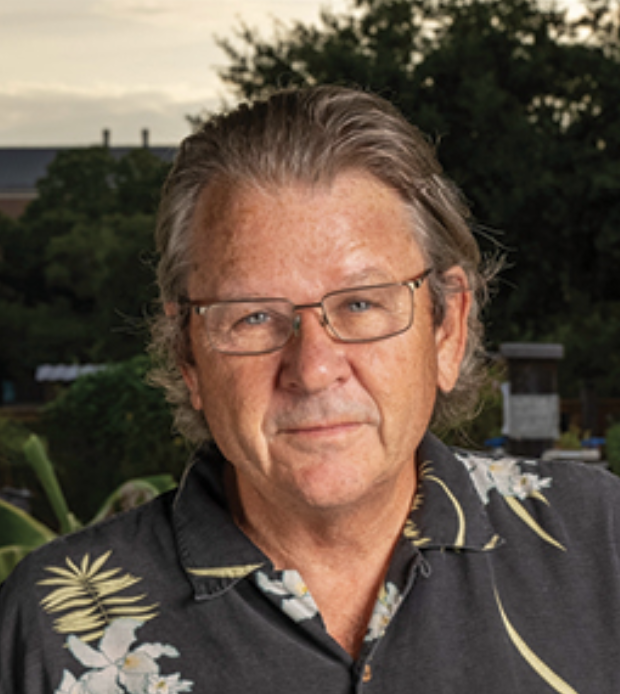
- Occupations: Biochemist, researcher and academic

Academic background
- Education: B.A. Biochemistry and Chemistry; Ph.D. Biochemistry
- Alma mater: Rice University
- Thesis: 3.5 angstrom resolution structure of L-arabinose binding protein from E. coli (1977)

Academic work
- Institutions: University of Wisconsin-Madison; Rice University
- Website: https://www.phillipslab.org/

George N. Phillips, Jr. is a biochemist, researcher, and academic. He is the Ralph and Dorothy Looney Professor Emeritus of Biochemistry and Cell Biology at Rice University, where he also serves as Associate Dean for Special Projects at the Wiess School of Natural Sciences. Additionally, he holds the title of Professor Emeritus of biochemistry at the University of Wisconsin-Madison.

Phillips' research is primarily centered on protein structure, protein dynamics, and computational biology, with a specific emphasis on understanding the correlation between the dynamics of proteins and their biological functions. He has authored book chapters, and is an editor for the Handbook of Proteins: Structure, Function and Methods Volume 2. He is the recipient of the Arnold O. Beckman Research Award, the American Heart Association's Established Investigator Award, and the Vilas Associate Award.

Phillips is an Elected Fellow of the Biophysical Society, the American Crystallographic Association, and the American Association for the Advancement of Science. He served as president and vice-president of the American Crystallographic Association from 2011 to 2013. He also held the position of Editor-in-Chief for Structural Dynamics with the AIP Press and served as an Associate Editor for Critical Reviews in Biochemistry and Molecular Biology.

== Education ==
Phillips obtained his bachelor's degree in Biochemistry and Chemistry from Rice University in 1974 and followed it with a Ph.D. in biochemistry from the same institution in 1976. He also held a Robert A. Welch Predoctoral Fellowship from 1974 to 1976 and received a Postdoctoral Fellowship from the National Institutes of Health in 1977 as well as a Research Fellowship from the Medical Foundation in 1980.

== Career ==
Phillips started his academic career as an assistant professor at the University of Illinois Urbana-Champaign, followed by his appointment as a professor of biochemistry at Rice University in 1987. In 1993, he assumed the position of Rice Scientia Lecturer, subsequently receiving the Robert A. Welch Lecturer appointment in 2001. He joined the University of Wisconsin-Madison in 2000 as a professor of Biochemistry and took on the role of professor emeritus in 2012. He has been serving as a professor of chemistry, as well as the Ralph and Dorothy Looney Professor of Biochemistry and Cell Biology at Rice University.

== Research ==
Phillips has directed his research toward the field of computational biology, primarily exploring protein structure. In the Phillips Lab, his work has involved conducting research on the binding of oxygen and ligands to heme proteins, as well as the development of techniques for analyzing protein and nucleic acid dynamics through diffuse X-ray scattering analysis.

=== Protein structures ===
Phillips conducted various studies on protein structures and their functional implications. He examined the structural features of type 6 streptococcal M proteins, highlighting their predominantly alpha-helical coiled-coil, which demonstrates a unique conformation in bacterial surface projections. His research on the crystal structure of tropomyosin filaments proposed a model in which tropomyosin exhibited distinct conformations related to muscle contraction, suggesting a statistical mechanism for regulating muscle function.

In one of his highly cited studies, Phillips, alongside Fan Yang and Larry G. Moss, described the crystal structure of recombinant wild-type green fluorescent protein, unveiling a unique structure referred to as the "ß-can." This study also delved into the protective environment for the fluorophores within the cylinder and its applications in elucidating the effects of GFP mutants.

Phillips has utilized X-ray crystallography and various advanced spectroscopy techniques to provide details about the dynamic structural changes in proteins. He used X-ray crystallography to determine the structure of unstable intermediate caused by photodissociation of CO from myoglobin and provided insights into the dynamics and structural alterations involved in this protein reaction. In addition, his study focused on capturing the structural evolution of the protein on a picosecond timescale used time-resolved X-ray diffraction and mid-infrared spectroscopy on a myoglobin (Mb) mutant (L29F mutant) revealing conformational changes within the protein.

=== Heme proteins and ligand interactions ===
Phillips' research on heme proteins and ligand affinity has provided insights into engineering strategies for physiological functions. He explored the impact of His64 in sperm whale myoglobin on ligand affinity, shedding light on structural changes induced by ligand binding and mechanisms of ligand discrimination in myoglobin. By measuring CO binding properties in various mutants and comparing them to mutant myoglobins, he elucidated how mutations influence CO affinity. In his 1994 study, he delved into how heme proteins like myoglobin and hemoglobin differentiate between oxygen (O2) and carbon monoxide (CO) binding at the atomic level. He investigated the role of nitric oxide in physiological functions by examining the kinetics of NO-induced oxidation in myoglobins and hemoglobins revealing insights into protein engineering strategies aimed at mitigating hypertensive events.

=== Computational biology ===
Phillips' contributions to computational biology include advanced techniques for interpreting experimental data in complex chemical and biological systems. He focused on the interaction between troponin T (TnT) and tropomyosin, shedding light on the molecular mechanisms in muscle contractions. Additionally, he explored protein dynamics in crystals by using the Gaussian network model (GNM) and a crystallographic model to calculate Cα atom fluctuations in 113 proteins emphasizing the improved results obtained by considering neighboring molecules in the crystal. In a book chapter discussing ongoing advancements in experimental methods for complex chemical and biological systems, he highlighted the growing need for creative approaches and delved into the exploration of Normal Mode Analysis as a technique to address these challenges.

== Awards and honors ==
- 1982 – Arnold O. Beckman Research Award, University of Illinois
- 1983 – Established Investigator Award, American Heart Association
- 2003 – Vilas Associate Award, UW-Madison

== Bibliography ==
=== Books ===
- Handbook of Proteins: Structure, Function and Methods Volume 2 (2008) ISBN 978-0470060988

=== Selected articles ===
- Quillin, Michael L.; Arduini, Robert M.; Olson, John S.; Phillips, George N. (November 1993). "High-Resolution Crystal Structures of Distal Histidine Mutants of Sperm Whale Myoglobin". Journal of Molecular Biology. 234 (1): 140–155. doi:10.1006/jmbi.1993.1569. PMID 8230194.
- Springer, Barry A.; Sligar, Stephen G.; Olson, John S.; Phillips, George N. Jr. (May 1994). "Mechanisms of Ligand Recognition in Myoglobin". Chemical Reviews. 94 (3): 699–714. doi:10.1021/cr00027a007.
- Eich, Raymund F.; Li, Tiansheng; Lemon, Douglas D.; Doherty, Daniel H.; Curry, Shawn R.; Aitken, Jacqueline F.; Mathews, Antony J.; Johnson, Kenneth A.; Smith, Robert D.; Phillips, George N.; Olson, John S. (1 January 1996). "Mechanism of NO-Induced Oxidation of Myoglobin and Hemoglobin". Biochemistry. 35 (22): 6976–6983. doi:10.1021/bi960442g. PMID 8679521.
- Yang, Fan; Moss, Larry G.; Phillips, George N. (October 1996). "The molecular structure of green fluorescent protein". Nature Biotechnology. 14 (10): 1246–1251. doi:10.1038/nbt1096-1246. hdl:1911/19233. PMID 9631087.
- Schotte, Friedrich; Lim, Manho; Jackson, Timothy A.; Smirnov, Aleksandr V.; Soman, Jayashree; Olson, John S.; Phillips, George N.; Wulff, Michael; Anfinrud, Philip A. (20 June 2003). "Watching a Protein as it Functions with 150-ps Time-Resolved X-ray Crystallography". Science. 300 (5627): 1944–1947. Bibcode:2003Sci...300.1944S. doi:10.1126/science.1078797. PMID 12817148.
