= Frederic S. Lee =

Frederic S. Lee may refer to:

- Frederic Schiller Lee (1859–1939), American physiologist
- Frederic Sterling Lee (1949–2014), American economist
