= Ernest Lyman Scott =

American physiologist and researcher

- Born: August 18, 1877; Kinsman, Ohio
- Died: January 19, 1966 (aged 88); Bogota, New Jersey
- Scientific career
- Fields: Physiology
- Workplaces: Columbia University
- Thesis: The content of sugar in the blood under common laboratory conditions (1914)
- Doctoral students: Albert Baird Hastings

Ernest Lyman Scott (August 18, 1877–January 19, 1966) was an American physiologist and diabetes researcher who spent much of his career on the faculty at Columbia University. Scott's early work contributed to the modern understanding of the biology of insulin and its use in diabetes management, though the exact role and significance of his research in this context has been a subject of controversy. Later, Scott developed a standard blood test for diabetes. After retiring from Columbia in 1942, Scott went on to become a noted horticulturist.

== Education and academic career ==
Scott was born in Kinsman, Ohio. He attended Ohio Wesleyan University as an undergraduate and received his B.S. in 1902. He received his M.S. from the University of Chicago in 1911, working with Anton Carlson, and left Chicago to begin his faculty career with a brief period teaching at the University of Kansas. In 1912 he moved to a teaching position at Columbia University. He received his Ph.D. from Columbia in 1914 and remained on the faculty until his retirement in 1942, briefly interrupted by World War I service with the American Expeditionary Force in France. His tenure at Columbia included the development of blood tests for blood glucose and characterization of standards for identifying diabetes by blood test. Among his notable graduate students is physiologist Albert Baird Hastings.

== Role in the discovery of insulin ==
Scott's work with Carlson at the University of Chicago subsequently became a subject of controversy over the scientific priority of significant discoveries about insulin and diabetes, which earned Frederick Banting and John Macleod the Nobel Prize in Physiology or Medicine in 1923. Although Scott was only a master's student, he worked relatively independently in the Carlson laboratory, using dogs with surgically disrupted pancreas as animal models to measure his efforts to isolate a hypothesized anti-diabetic "active principle" found in pancreatic secretions. Evidence from his 1911 master's thesis suggests that he did successfully isolate a protein with observable clinical benefits in his experimental diabetic dogs, which by his description must have been insulin. However, Scott's thesis was not published in its original form until much later, in 1966. Instead, while departing for his new position in Kansas, Scott left his thesis with Carlson, who published a version in Scott's name in 1912 in the American Journal of Physiology.

In their subsequent work on insulin and diabetes, Frederick Banting and Charles Best expanded upon the themes in Scott's work and cited the 1912 paper. However, later controversy arose regarding Carlson's edits to Scott's thesis to produce the paper, which included a summary and conclusion paragraph described as "cautious" and insufficient to establish his priority in isolating insulin; in fact, writing in 1964, Scott himself denied authorship of the 1912 paper. The award of the 1923 Nobel to Banting and Macleod attracted dispute from a variety of sources, with Banting himself objecting to Macleod's inclusion and ultimately sharing his award money with his research associate Charles Best; Macleod sharing his with another member of the team, James Collip; and other researchers in the field, including Scott, contending that their role in the discovery had been overlooked and earlier work undercited. Scott's wife self-published a book on the subject years later called Great Scott: Ernest Lyman Scott's work with insulin in 1911.

== Personal life ==
Scott's wife Aleita Hopping Scott also held a Ph.D. in physiology and shared his interest in plants and gardening. After Ernest Scott's retirement from Columbia, the couple established a reputation as horticulturists, extensively documenting their garden at their home in New Jersey. Ernest Scott served as the founding president of the National Chrysanthemum Society of America and Aleita co-founded the American Primrose Society. The couple coauthored a book on chrysanthemums.

Ernest Scott died in 1966. His papers are held by the National Library of Medicine and the New York Botanical Garden.
