= Direct methods (crystallography) =

In crystallography, direct methods are a family of methods for estimating the phases of the Fourier transform of the scattering density from the corresponding magnitudes. The methods generally exploit constraints or statistical correlations between the phases of different Fourier components that result from the fact that the scattering density must be a positive real number.

In two dimensions, it is relatively easy to solve the phase problem directly, but not so in three dimensions. The key step was taken by Herbert A. Hauptman and Jerome Karle, who developed a practical method to employ the Sayre equation for which they were awarded the 1985 Nobel prize in Chemistry. The Nobel Prize citation was "for their outstanding achievements in the development of direct methods for the determination of crystal structures."

At present, direct methods are the preferred method for phasing crystals of small molecules having up to 1000 atoms in the asymmetric unit. However, they are generally not feasible by themselves for larger molecules such as proteins.

Several software packages implement direct methods.

== See also ==
- Direct methods (electron microscopy)
- Phase problem
- X-ray crystallography
