= John Call Dalton =

American biochemist (1825–1889)

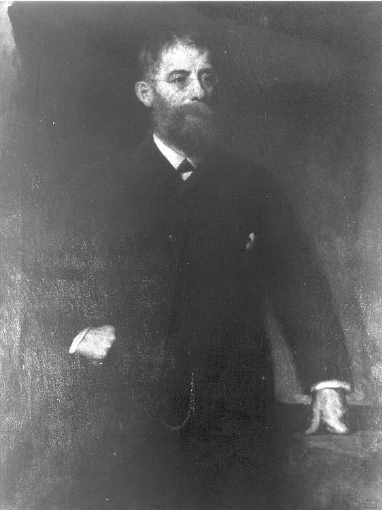
- Dalton in 1886
- Born: February 2, 1825; Chelmsford, Massachusetts, U.S.
- Died: February 12, 1889 (aged 64); California
- Education: Harvard University
- Known for: Topographical Anatomy of the Brain
- Scientific career
- Fields: Physiology
- Institutions: University at Buffalo, Vermont medical college, Long Island College Hospital
- Academic advisors: Claude Bernard

John Call Dalton (February 2, 1825 – February 12, 1889) was an American physiologist and vivisection activist who became the first full-time professor of physiology in the United States.

== Early life ==
Dalton was born in Chelmsford, Massachusetts. He studied under French physiologist Claude Bernard in France. Dalton had two understudies: John Green Curtis and William Stewart Halsted. Dalton and Curtis were associated with the Columbia University College of Physicians and Surgeons in New York. Dalton was a professor of physiology at the college; however, it is unclear whether his son was as well. Dalton received his undergraduate and medical degrees from Harvard University.

== Career ==
The anatomy of the brain was primarily drawn by Europeans prior to Dalton's more detailed and precise sketches of the brain. Dalton received an award from the American Medical Association in 1851 for his essay "Corpus Luteum". He was a professor at the University at Buffalo for a brief time, but resigned in 1854. Dalton served as a professor or chairperson at the Vermont medical college and the Long Island College Hospital. John became the president of the College of Physicians and Surgeons in 1884.

Dalton served as a surgeon in the national service during the American Civil War from 1861 to 1864. Prior to his resignation in 1864, Dalton was a prominent member in the medical corps of the national service. He served in the 7th New York Militia regiment in 1861. Dalton joined the national services as soon as the war commenced. He was primarily a surgeon during this time, and spent a lot of time treating the wounded. John was originally in the US Navy, with the rank of medical officer. However, he spent time as well in the army corps, where he served as the medical inspector in the 6th Army Corps. He was transferred to the Army of the Potomac where he was made chief medical inspector of the field-hospitals. Once Dalton resigned in 1865, he was promoted to brevet lieutenant colonel as well as colonel of volunteers.

Dalton became the sanitary superintendent of the New York Metropolitan Board of Health in March 1866. During the same year in which he resigned from that position, Dalton implemented the ambulance system in New York. Dalton's books included The Treatise on Human Physiology. and the Topographical Anatomy of the Brain. The American Academy of Arts and Sciences elected Dalton as a member in 1864.

Dalton died of tuberculosis in California in 1889.

== Vivisection ==
Dalton was a staunch supporter of vivisection. He conducted experiments on living animals at the University of Buffalo and promoted vivisection to medical schools throughout the United States. In 1866, he authored Vivisection: What It Is and What It has Accomplished for the New York Academy of Medicine. It summarized the benefits of vivisection.

== Works ==
- A Treatise on Physiology and Hygiene : for Schools, Families, and Colleges. – New York : London : Harper & Bros.; Sampson Low, Son & Marston, 1869
- A treatise on human physiology : designed for the use of students and practitioners of medicine. – Philadelphia: Blanchard and Lea, 1861
- The Experimental Method of Medicine – Philadelphia, 1882
- Doctrines of the circulation : a history of physiological opinion and discovery, in regard to the circulation of the blood. – Philadelphia : Henry C. Lea's Son & Co., 1884
- Topographical anatomy of the brain. – Philadelphia, Lea brothers & Co., 1885

Speech

- Vivisection; what it is, and what it has accomplished. - Read before New York Academy of Medicine. Dec 13, 1866

Script : University of Michigan, University Library

=== Autobiography ===
- John Call Dalton, M.D., U.S.V.. – [Cambridge: Riverside Press], 1892 ( regarding his brief service in the 7th New York Infantry , National Guard)

== Sources ==
- S. Weir Mitchell: Memoir of John Call Dalton, 1825–1889. In: National Academy of Sciences : Biographical Memoirs. – Washington, DC: National Academy of Sciences, 1895, Vol. III, pp. 177–185.
