= Albert Baird Hastings =

American biochemist and physiologist

- Born: November 20, 1895; Dayton, Kentucky, U.S.
- Died: September 24, 1987 (aged 91); La Jolla, California, U.S.
- Education: University of Michigan (B.S.), Columbia University (Ph.D.)
- Known for: Study of acid-base homeostasis
- Scientific career
- Fields: Biochemistry, physiology
- Workplaces: University of Chicago; Harvard Medical School; Scripps Research Institute; University of California, San Diego
- Thesis: The Physiology of Fatigue: Physico-Chemical Manifestations of Fatigue in the Blood (1921)
- Doctoral advisor: Ernest L. Scott
- Notable students: John Buchanan

Albert Baird Hastings (November 20, 1895 – September 24, 1987) was an American biochemist and physiologist. He spent 28 years as the department chair and Hamilton Kuhn Professor of Biological Chemistry at Harvard University. After retiring from Harvard, Hastings moved to the Scripps Clinic and Research Foundation (now Scripps Research), where he became the director of the division of biochemistry and helped to establish the institution's emerging program in basic research. In 1966, he became one of the first faculty members at the University of California, San Diego's new medical school. His research focused on the biochemical underpinnings of physiology and included characterizing acid-base homeostasis in blood and pioneering the use of radioactive tracers for studying metabolism. Hastings received a number of honors and awards for his work, including election to the National Academy of Sciences in 1937 and the President's Medal for Merit in 1948 following his wartime service on the Committee for Medical Research. Hastings died of heart failure in 1987 at age 91.

== Early life and education ==
Hastings was born in Dayton, Kentucky on November 20, 1985, and raised in Indianapolis, Indiana. After his father died young of tuberculosis, Hastings intended to drop out of high school to find work, but a high school teacher arranged a biology assistantship for him that enabled him to finish his studies. After graduation, Hastings began his undergraduate work at the University of Michigan, originally intending to study chemical engineering but switching to chemistry after being recruited as a laboratory assistant by physical chemist Floyd Bartell.

Hastings graduated from Michigan in 1917 but had arranged to begin his Ph.D. studies a semester in advance. The entry of the United States into World War I in 1917 disrupted his plans, but Hastings was not accepted for military service and instead began work with the Public Health Service as a "sanitary chemist" studying the physiological mechanisms of fatigue. Originally the work involved studying fatigue in human workers, but Hastings requested an opportunity to work under more controlled conditions in animal models and thus was sent to Columbia University for further study. After the end of the war, Columbia physiologist Frederic Schiller Lee asked Hastings to remain at Columbia for a Ph.D. Supervised by Ernest L. Scott, Hastings was awarded the degree in 1921. He later described the Public Health Service job as a key turning point in his developing career.

After graduation, Hastings became a research assistant to Donald Van Slyke at the Rockefeller Institute (now Rockefeller University), a position described as "probably the best job in the country in 1921 for a fresh Ph.D." His work there, in collaboration with clinical researchers, helped to establish the foundation of modern understanding of clinical chemistry.

== Academic career ==
Hastings began his independent research career in 1926, when he accepted a faculty position at the University of Chicago. He continued to study electrolyte imbalances and the physiological mechanisms of acid-base homeostasis. In 1930, he served as a visiting professor at the Peking Union Medical College in China, where he worked with Otto Folin's former student Hsien Wu. Folin, at the time the Hamilton Kuhn Professor and chair of the biological chemistry department at Harvard Medical School, died in 1934, prompting Harvard president James B. Conant to offer the position to Hastings.

Hastings assumed the chairmanship of the biological chemistry department at Harvard in 1935 and would remain there for the next 28 years. During his tenure, Hastings was recognized as an enthusiastic teacher of medical students and mentor to the scientists in his research group, noted later for producing an unusual number of future professors of clinical medicine. He was also an advocate for the admission of women to Harvard Medical School. In his own laboratory, he developed techniques for using radioactive tracers, specifically the short-lived isotope carbon-11, to study mammalian metabolism.

From 1941 to 1946, Hastings served as a member of the Committee on Medical Research, a World War II effort to fund medical research on a large scale that later laid the groundwork for basic research funding by the National Institutes of Health. Subsequently, Hastings served on a variety of councils and advisory bodies directing federal funding of biomedical research, and was recognized at the end of his life for his key role in establishing modern government research funding mechanisms in the United States. In connection with this role, Hastings traveled to Moscow to meet with Soviet scientists and share samples of penicillin, then being actively studied by CMR-funded projects. Hastings also held a number of roles in scientific societies, serving as the president of the American Society for Biochemistry and Molecular Biology from 1945 to 1946, the president of the Society for Experimental Biology and Medicine in 1945–7, and the vice president of the American Association for the Advancement of Science in 1965.

At age 63, Hastings arranged an early retirement from his Harvard position in order to return to research from his administration-heavy duties and moved to the Scripps Clinic and Research Foundation (now Scripps Research Institute) in La Jolla, California. His role there was to expand the institution's basic research program, which at the time was limited in scope; when he arrived he received a large grant from the National Institutes of Health which helped to initiate this effort. At Scripps he continued tracer studies to explore the role of carbon dioxide in metabolism. Wanting to continue to focus on research rather than administration, he recruited Frank Huennekens to Scripps to build and develop the biochemistry department there, much as Hastings had previously done at Harvard.

In 1966 Hastings became one of the first faculty members of the newly established University of California, San Diego School of Medicine, where he joined the neurosciences department and worked on curriculum development. Hastings also maintained an office and presence at the Scripps Institution of Oceanography, serving as a mentor for younger biomedical scientists there.

== Awards and honors ==
Hastings received a number of awards and honors throughout his career.

- Member of the American Academy of Arts and Sciences, 1936
- Member of the National Academy of Sciences, 1937
- Member of the American Philosophical Society, 1941
- Medal for Merit, 1948
- American College of Physicians award, 1965
- United States Public Health Service citation, 1965

== Personal life ==
Hastings married his wife Margaret in 1918, and they had a son Alan Baird Hastings the following year. The couple frequently entertained during Hastings' Harvard career and hosted social teas for the medical students. Their son (who, like his father, went by the name Baird) became a conductor and music director; he died in 2007.

Albert Baird Hastings died in La Jolla at age 91 of heart failure.
