= Lawrence O. Brockway =

American physical chemist

Lawrence Olin Brockway
- Born: September 23, 1907; Topeka, Kansas
- Died: November 17, 1979 (aged 72)
- Education: Caltech (Ph.D.); University of Nebraska (B.S., M.S.)
- Awards: ACS Award in Pure Chemistry (1940)
- Scientific career
- Fields: Physical chemistry
- Workplaces: University of Michigan
- Doctoral advisor: Linus Pauling
- Doctoral students: Lawrence Bartell; Isabella Karle; Jerome Karle

Lawrence Olin Brockway (1907-1979) was a physical chemist who spent most of his career at the University of Michigan, where he developed early methods for electron diffraction.

== Early life and education ==
Brockway was born on September 23, 1907, in Topeka, Kansas. He attended the University of Nebraska and received his B.S. in 1929 and his M.S. a year later. He then moved to the California Institute of Technology, where he was one of the first graduate students of Linus Pauling. He and Pauling were interested in the physics of interatomic interactions and focused their efforts on the structure of chalcopyrite, which established Brockway's interest in electron diffraction as a method for studying molecular structure. Brockway received his Ph.D. in 1933. He spent the next several years as a research fellow at Caltech and then received a Guggenheim Fellowship in 1937 to spend the following year at the University of Oxford and Royal Institution.

== Academic career ==
After returning to the United States in 1938, Brockway joined the faculty at the University of Michigan, where he reached the rank of full professor in 1945 and remained until he assumed professor emeritus status at the end of 1976. During his career at Michigan he was noted as a committed educator and continued teaching specialized seminars after his retirement. Brockway's research interests focused primarily on continued development of electron diffraction, which he began studying as a graduate student, and broadened later to include surface chemistry and thin films.

Brockway received the American Chemical Society Award for Pure Chemistry in 1940. He held a number of leadership positions in scientific societies: he helped to found the American Crystallographic Association and served as its president in 1953, as well as serving in various capacities with the International Union of Crystallography and with the National Research Council. He also became a founding member of the Electron Microscope Society of America, in 1942. In addition, he consulted for external institutions working on defense-related projects during World War II and for industrial interests thereafter.

Brockway was the Ph.D. advisor of future Michigan chemist Lawrence Bartell and of 1985 Nobel Prize in Chemistry winner Jerome Karle, as well as his wife and scientific collaborator Isabella Karle.

Brockway died on November 17, 1979.
