= Izaak Kolthoff =

Dutch-American chemist (1894–1993)

Izaak Maurits Kolthoff
- Born: 11 February 1894; Almelo, Netherlands
- Died: 4 March 1993 (aged 99); St. Paul, Minnesota
- Other name: Piet Kolthoff
- Education: University of Utrecht
- Known for: Introducing modern methods to analytical chemistry; Development of "cold process" rubber synthesis
- Awards: Commander in the Order of Orange-Nassau (1947); William H. Nichols Medal (1949); Willard Gibbs Award (1964)
- Scientific career
- Fields: Analytical Chemistry
- Workplaces: University of Utrecht; University of Minnesota
- Doctoral advisor: Nicholas Schoorl

Izaak Maurits (Piet) Kolthoff (February 11, 1894 – March 4, 1993) was an analytical chemist and chemistry educator. He is widely considered the father of analytical chemistry for his large volume of published research in diverse fields of analysis, his work to modernize and promote the field, and for advising a large number of students who went on to influential careers of their own.

Kolthoff's best-known research contribution was the development of the "cold process" for producing synthetic rubber, which he undertook under the U.S. synthetic rubber program during World War II. He was also active in social causes, including promoting world peace and opposing nuclear weapons testing.

Kolthoff received a PhD in chemistry from the University of Utrecht in his native Netherlands. In 1927, he immigrated to the United States, joining the faculty at the University of Minnesota, where he worked for more than 60 years.

== Early life and education ==
Kolthoff was born in Almelo, Netherlands, on February 11, 1894, the son of Moses and Rosetta (Wysenbeek) Kolthoff. He was the youngest of three children. At an early age, Kolthoff received the nickname "Piet" for unknown reasons; he continued to be called by this nickname throughout his life.

Kolthoff's introduction to chemistry in high school inspired a keen interest in the subject. He graduated from high school in 1911 and enrolled at the University of Utrecht in Utrecht, Netherlands. Kolthoff wanted to study chemistry, but at that time students in the physical sciences were required to have studied either Latin or Greek languages; Kolthoff, who was already fluent in Dutch, German French, and English, choose to study pharmacy in order to avoid this requirement.

The pharmacy program at Utrecht provided a strong foundation in analytical chemistry. There Kolthoff met Nicholas Schoorl, a professor of pharmacy who became his academic adviser. Schoorl's instruction in analytical chemistry provided an emphasis on fundamental chemical principles, which was unusual at the time. He introduced Kolthoff to research in the areas of electro-analytical chemistry and co-precipitation. He also advised Kolthoff to approach analytical chemistry from a scientific perspective as opposed to an empirical one. Kolthoff would adopt and later promote Schoorl's adage towards research, "Theory guides, experiment decides."

Kolthoff published his first paper in 1915 on pH, a concept that had been introduced by S. P. L. Sørensen in 1909. Also in 1915, Kolthoff obtained an "apotheker" degree in pharmacy. He continued his education at Utrecht with advanced courses in physical and colloid chemistry. When the classical language requirement for physical sciences was lifted in 1918, Kolthoff received a PhD in chemistry from the University of Utrecht. By the time he received his doctoral degree, Kolthoff had already published 32 papers in several fields.

== Career ==
Kolthoff remained at the University of Utrecht as a lecturer in electrochemistry and a researcher until 1927. During this time he authored or coauthored 270 papers and three books and promoted the concept of pH, which was not well understood at the time. He also conducted a lecture tour of the United States and Canada in 1924. These activities earned him an international reputation.

In 1927 he was offered a one-year appointment at the University of Minnesota. He accepted the position and continued his research and writing, producing English translations and expansions of much of his previous work. The position became permanent, and soon he became professor and chief of the analytical division of the University's school of chemistry.

During World War II, Kolthoff worked on a U.S. government-backed research program to develop a synthetic method for producing rubber, and he served as chairman of the Committee on Analytical Research Methods and supervisor of three research projects related to the project. His research in emulsion polymerization and development of a low-temperature "cold process" for producing synthetic rubber were among his most well-known research contributions.

Kolthoff retired in 1962, at which time he had authored 809 research papers. After his retirement, he continued working and published an additional 136 papers, bringing his career total to 945.

=== Research ===
Kolthoff worked in several diverse areas of chemistry. They included acid-base titrimetry, electrometric analysis and conductometry, potentiometry, electron transfer, gravimetric analysis and precipitation reactions, polarographic analysis (voltammetry), amperometric titrations, and emulsion polymerization, among others. His reputation for combining fundamental theory and practical application in his work were characteristic throughout his career. Kolthoff's scientific approach to analysis is widely accepted today, but was rare in the early 1900s when his career began.

=== Teaching ===
Kolthoff advised 51 doctoral students in chemistry at the University of Minnesota, including Johannes F. Coetzee, Herbert A. Laitinen, James J. Lingane and Ernest B. Sandell, and several other masters and bachelors students. In 1993 it was estimated that more than 1,500 PhD chemists, including Allen J. Bard, could trace their academic lineage to Kolthoff.

=== Professional contributions ===
Kolthoff was a proponent for establishing analytical chemistry as a modern scientific discipline and elevating its reputation among chemists generally. Kolthoff was involved in the founding of the American Chemical Society (ACS) Division of Analytical Chemistry in 1938 and the establishment of the Analytical Chemistry Division of the International Union of Pure and Applied Chemistry (IUPAC) in 1951.

Kolthoff served on the editorial board of the ACS journal Industrial and Engineering Chemistry Analytical Edition from 1935 until 1942 and ACS's Analytical Chemistry when it was introduced in 1948.

=== Selected list of publications ===
Kolthoff authored nearly 1,000 scientific papers, nine books, and several other publications over the course of his career.

- Der Gebrauch von Farbenindikatoren (1922): Kolthoff's first published monograph. This book went through several German editions and was translated into English in 1926. It was later titled "Acid-Base Indicators" after being expanded in 1937 with C. Rosenblum as coauthor.
- Konduktometrische Titrationen (1924) and Potentiometric Titrations (1926):Kolthoff began to use conductometry and poteniometry in 1918 and 1920, respectively, which led to these two monograms. Potentiometric Titrations was especially influential, not only in analytical chemistry, but in other fields as well.
- Massanalyse (two volumes in 1927 and 1928): A continuation of his fundamental studies of classical methods, it was translated and coauthored by N. H. Furman in 1928 under the title "Volumetric Analysis." It also appeared much later (1942–1958) in an expanded three-volume edition coauthored by V.A. Stenger, G. Matsuyama, and R. Belcher.
- The Colorimetric and Potentiometric Determination of pH (1931): This was Kolthoff's first book that was meant to be used as text for instruction. It was expanded with H. A. Laitinen in 1941 and released under the title "pH and Electrotitrations."
- Textbook of Quantitative Inorganic Analysis (1936): Co-authored by E. B. Sandell, this book presented fundamentals and experimental features of analysis, and was among Kolthoff's most influential textbooks. In 1969 it appeared under the new title "Quantitative Chemical Analysis," with contributions from Sandell, E. J. Meehan, and S. Bruckenstein as coauthors.
- Polarography (1941): Co-authored with James J. Lingane, this introduction to voltammetry was expanded in 1952 into two volumes.
- Emulsion Polymerization (1955): This book related to Kolthoff's work in synthetic rubber and his development of cold rubber. It was coauthored with F.A. Bovey, A.I. Medalia, and E.J. Meehan.
- Treatise on Analytical Chemistry (first edition 1959): Co-published with Philip J. Elving, this is Kolthoff's largest and most notable work. The volume is in three parts: "Theory and Practice" (11 volumes, published between 1959 and 1976), "Analytical Chemistry of Inorganic and Organic Compounds" (16 volumes, published between 1961 and 1980), and "Analytical Chemistry in Industry" (four volumes, completed in 1977)

== Personal life and activism ==
During World War II, Kolthoff worked with the Rockefeller Foundation to relocate European scientists who were persecuted by Nazis to universities in the U.S. Following World War II, he traveled to the Soviet Union and Yugoslavia to build cooperation with scientists there.

Kolthoff corresponded with science and political leaders including Albert Einstein, Eleanor Roosevelt, Linus Pauling and Hubert Humphrey on issues of global importance that included promoting peace and opposing nuclear weapons testing. His correspondence with Frédéric Joliot-Curie about a communist-dominated nuclear weapons conference and his opposition to Senator Joseph McCarthy's anti-communist activities caught the attention of the House Un-American Activities Committee. He was accused of belonging to several subversive organizations, but no actions were taken against him.

Kolthoff never married and lived most of his life a short distance from the chemistry building, in later life in a small apartment on the first floor of Comstock Hall (at the time an all female dormatory) and maintained an office on the sixth floor of the Coffman Union. After retiring, he continued working with his lab assistant Miron Chantooni. Kolthoff died of kidney failure on 4 March 1993 at Bethesda Lutheran Hospital and Rehabilitation Center in St. Paul.

== Awards and honors ==
Kolthoff was the recipient of many awards, honorary degrees, and other honors throughout his career, some of which are listed below.

=== Awards and medals ===
- William H. Nichols Medal, New York Section, American Chemical Society, 1949
- Fisher Award (now called the ACS Award in Analytical Chemistry), American Chemical Society, 1950
- Willard Gibbs Medal Award, Chicago Section, American Chemical Society, 1964
- Charles Medal, Charles University, 1964
- Kolthoff Gold Medal, Academy of Pharmaceutical Sciences of the American Pharmaceutical Association (now the American Pharmacists Association), 1967
- Award for Excellence in Education (now called the J. Calvin Giddings Award for Excellence in Education), American Chemical Society Division of Analytical Chemistry, 1983
- Robert Boyle Prize for Analytical Science, Royal Society of Chemistry, 1984

=== Honorary degrees ===
- University of Chicago, 1955
- University of Groningen, 1964
- Brandeis University, 1974
- The Hebrew University of Jerusalem, 1975

=== Other honors ===
Kolthoff was named a Commander in the Order of Orange-Nassau, a civil and military honor provided by the Kingdom of the Netherlands, in 1947. In 1958, Kolthoff was elected a member of the National Academy of Sciences. He was also a fellow of the American Academy of Arts and Sciences, an honorary member of the American Pharmaceutical Association, and an honorary member of eight foreign chemical societies.

The Regents of the University of Minnesota named the university's 1972 chemistry building Kolthoff Hall in his honor. The university's Department of Chemistry began the annual Kolthoff Lectureship in 1979.

On his eightieth birthday, the Division of Analytical Chemistry of the American Chemical Society sponsored the I.M. Kolthoff 80th Anniversary Symposium. The Division offers the I. M. Kolthoff Enrichment Awards for Undergraduate Students.

Kolthoff was inducted into the Minnesota Inventors Hall of Fame in 1985 and the Minnesota Science and Technology Hall of Fame in 2012. In 2014, the American Chemical Society named Kolthoff's contributions to modern analytical chemistry a National Historic Chemical Landmark.
