= Herbert A. Hauptman =

American mathematician (1917–2011)

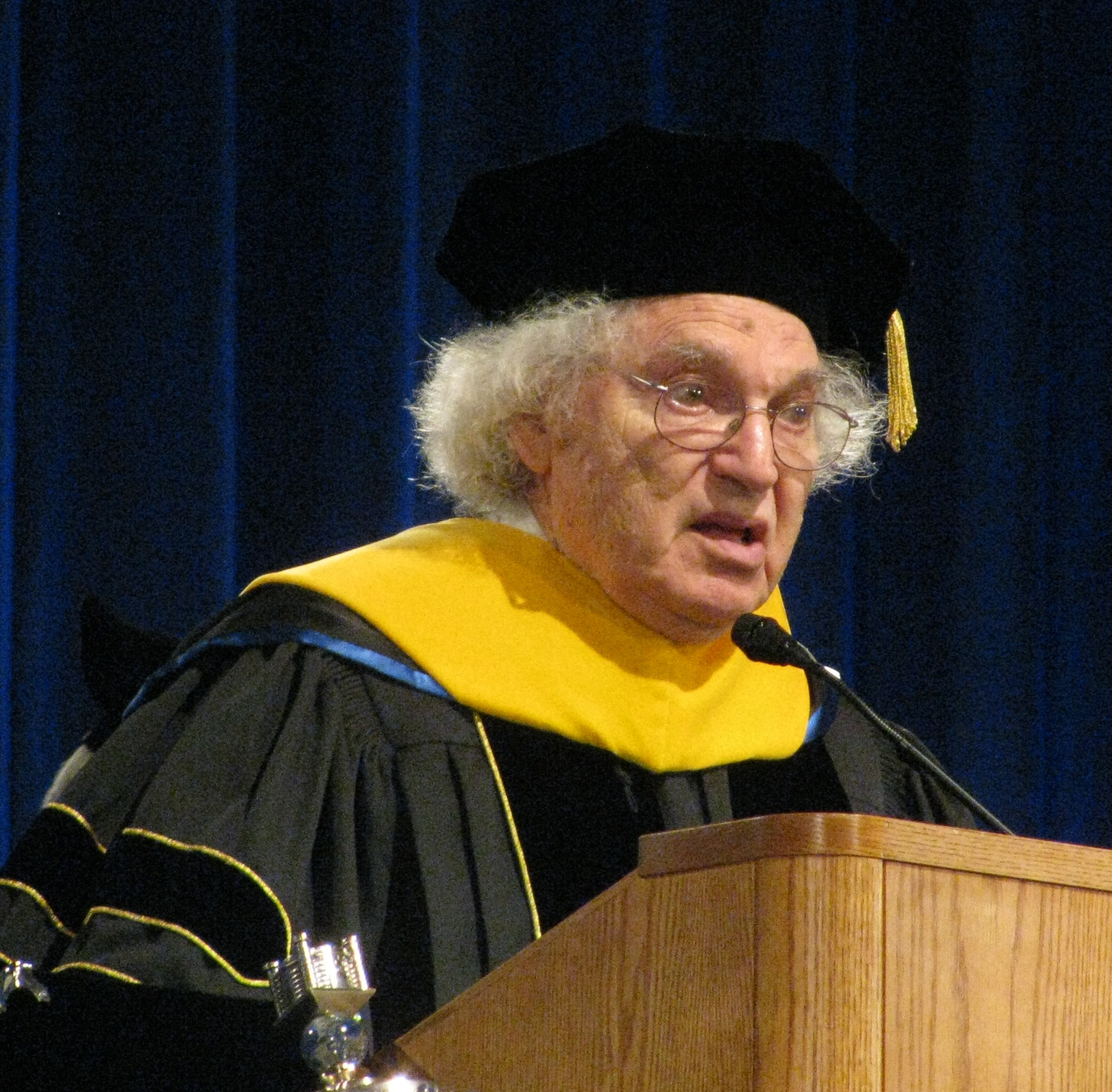
- Hauptman in 2009
- Born: Herbert Aaron Hauptman; February 14, 1917; New York City, U.S.
- Died: October 23, 2011 (aged 94); Buffalo, New York, U.S.
- Education: City College of New York (BS); Columbia University (MA); University of Maryland, College Park (PhD)
- Spouse: Edith Citrynell (m. 1940)
- Children: 2
- Awards: Nobel Prize in Chemistry (1985) (jointly with Jerome Karle); UNSW Dirac Medal (1991)
- Scientific career
- Fields: Mathematics
- Workplaces: Hauptman-Woodward Medical Research Institute; University at Buffalo

Herbert Aaron Hauptman (February 14, 1917 – October 23, 2011) was an American mathematician and Nobel laureate. He pioneered and developed a mathematical method that has changed the whole field of chemistry and opened a new era in research in determination of molecular structures of crystallized materials. Today, Hauptman's direct methods, which he continued to improve and refine, are routinely used to solve complicated structures. It was the application of this mathematical method to a wide variety of chemical structures that led the Royal Swedish Academy of Sciences to name Hauptman and Jerome Karle recipients of the 1985 Nobel Prize in Chemistry.

== Background ==
Hauptman was born to a Jewish family in New York City, on February 14, 1917, the oldest child of Leah (Rosenfeld) and Israel Hauptman. He was married to Edith Citrynell since November 10, 1940, with two daughters, Barbara (1947) and Carol (1950).

He was interested in science and mathematics from an early age which he pursued at Townsend Harris High School, graduated from the City College of New York (1937) and obtained an M.A. degree in mathematics from Columbia University in 1939.

After the war he started a collaboration with Jerome Karle at the Naval Research Laboratory in Washington, D.C., and at the same time enrolled in the Ph.D. program at the University of Maryland, College Park. He received his Ph.D. from the University of Maryland in 1955 in mathematics with a dissertation in the number theory classification. This combination of mathematics and physical chemistry expertise enabled them to tackle head-on the phase problem of X-ray crystallography. His work on this problem was criticized because, at the time, the problem was believed unsolvable. By 1955 he had received his Ph.D. in mathematics, and they had laid the foundations of the direct methods in X-ray crystallography. Their 1953 monograph, "Solution of the Phase Problem I. The Centrosymmetric Crystal", contained the main ideas, the most important of which was the introduction of probabilistic methods through a development of the Sayre equation.

In 1970 he joined the crystallographic group of the Medical Foundation of Buffalo of which he was research director in 1972. During the early years of this period he formulated the neighborhood principle and extension concept. These theories were further developed during the following decades.

In 2003, as an atheist and secular humanist, he was one of 22 Nobel laureates who signed the Humanist Manifesto. In 2006, the American Humanist Association awarded him the Isaac Asimov Science Award.

Hauptman died in Buffalo, New York on October 23, 2011, at the age of 94.

== Works ==
Hauptman authored over 170 publications, including journal articles, research papers, chapters and books. In 1970, Hauptman joined the crystallographic group of the Hauptman-Woodward Medical Research Institute (formerly the Medical Foundation of Buffalo) of which he became research director in 1972. Until his death, he served as president of the Hauptman-Woodward Medical Research Institute as well as research professor in the department of biophysical sciences and adjunct professor in the department of computer science at the University at Buffalo. Prior to coming to Buffalo, he worked as a mathematician and supervisor in various departments at the Naval Research Laboratory from 1947. He received his B.S. from City College of New York, M.A. from Columbia University and Ph.D. from the University of Maryland, College Park.

== Awards and titles ==
- Belden Prize in Mathematics, City College of New York, 1936
- Scientific Research Society of America, Pure Science Award, Naval Research Laboratory, 1959
- President, Philosophical Society of Washington, 1969–1970
- President of the Association of Independent Research Institutes, 1979–1980
- Patterson Award in 1984 given by the American Crystallographic Association
- Nobel Prize in Chemistry, 1985 (jointly with Jerome Karle)
- Honorary degrees from the University of Maryland, College Park in 1985
- Honorary degree from CCNY in 1986
- Citizen of the Year Award, Buffalo Evening News, 1986
- Norton Medal, SUNY, 1986
- Schoellkopf Award, American Chemical Society (Western New York Chapter) 1986
- Golden Plate Award of the American Academy of Achievement, 1986
- Cooke Award, SUNY, 1987
- Establishment of the Eccles-Hauptman Student Award, SUNY in 1987
- Election to the National Academy of Sciences in 1988
- Humanist Laureate Award from the International Humanist and Ethical Union in 1988
- Honorary degree from the University of Parma, Italy in 1989
- Honorary degree from the D'Youville College, Buffalo, New York in 1989
- Honorary degree from Bar-Ilan University, Israel in 1990
- Honorary degree from Columbia University in 1990
- Honorary degree from Technical University of Lodz, Poland in 1992
- Honorary degree from Queen's University, Kingston, Canada in 1993
- Honorary degree from SUNY at Buffalo, Buffalo, New York in 2009

== See also ==
- List of Jewish Nobel laureates
