= John Green Curtis =

American physiologist

- Born: October 29, 1844; New York City
- Died: September 21, 1913 (aged 68); Chatham, Massachusetts
- Scientific career
- Fields: Physiology
- Institutions: Columbia University

John Green Curtis (October 29, 1844 – September 21, 1913) was an American physiologist who spent most of his career at the Columbia University College of Physicians and Surgeons. Curtis was one of the founding members of the American Physiological Society, and hosted its first meeting in his Columbia laboratory space.

== Early life and education ==
Curtis was born on October 29, 1844, in New York City, New York. He attended Harvard College and received his bachelor's degree in 1866 and his master's degree in 1869. He received his M.D. in 1870 from the College of Physicians and Surgeons, then a loose affiliate of Columbia University not integrated fully into the school until 1891. He received the honorary LL.D. degree in 1904.

== Academic career ==
Curtis began his career in clinical practice even before he had formally received his MD with a junior appointment at Bellevue Hospital. He remained there for several years, eventually reaching the rank of attending surgeon in 1876 and serving in that role until 1880. He also became a medical school demonstrator at Columbia shortly after receiving his MD and remained on the teaching staff in various roles until becoming a professor in 1883. When John Call Dalton became the school's dean in 1883, Curtis took his place as a professor of physiology. Throughout his years at Columbia, Curtis was involved in education and service roles, including fourteen years as secretary of the faculty, six as the medical school representative on the university council, and one as acting dean of the faculty of medicine. Curtis retired from Columbia in 1909 and assumed professor emeritus status.

Although Curtis was not especially active as a researcher, he was deeply interested in the education of medical students and in the history of medicine and physiology. He was one of five men recognized as the key founders of the American Physiological Society, and hosted its first meeting of seventeen attendees in his laboratory space at Columbia on December 30, 1887. He served on the APS council from its founding until 1893. Along with APS co-founder Silas Weir Mitchell, he worked to study the history of physiology on behalf of the society. He also sought to improve medical education in physiology, hiring Frederic Schiller Lee as a demonstrator at Columbia to develop more practical laboratory instruction. He contributed to a widely used physiology textbook and wrote a book of medical history called Harvey's Views on the Circulation of the Blood, published in 1915.

Curtis died in Chatham, Massachusetts on September 21, 1913.

== Family ==
Curtis married at Christ Church Cathedral , Montreal, on 13 December 1902 Netta Easter Blackwood, daughter of Henry James Blackwood, of Norwich.
