= Wiess School of Natural Sciences =

Academic school at Rice University

- Motto: The Frontiers of Knowledge
- Type: Private
- Established: 1912
- Affiliations: Rice University
- Dean: Thomas C. Killian
- Location: Houston, Texas, United States; 29.7191°N 95.4013°W

The Wiess School of Natural Sciences is an academic school at Rice University in Houston, Texas. It comprises the departments of BioSciences (a merging of Biochemistry and Cell Biology and Ecology and Evolutionary Biology); Chemistry; Earth, Environment, and Planetary Sciences; Kinesiology; Mathematics; and Physics and Astronomy. Rice is well known for its groundbreaking research in nanotechnology. As well as an undergraduate in instruction, the school also supports a professional science master's program. One of Rice's greatest minds and pioneers of the field was Richard Smalley, the Norman Hackerman Professor of Chemistry and Professor of Physics and Astronomy. Smalley received the Nobel Prize (along with chemist Robert Curl) in 1996 for the discovery buckminsterfullerene, an allotrope of carbon commonly referred to as "buckyballs".

== About Natural Sciences at Rice ==
The four founding departments of Rice (Biology, Chemistry, Mathematics, Physics) are still a part of the Wiess School, which has historically been known for its strength in the sciences. Its Department of Space Science was established in 1963. The land on which the Lyndon B. Johnson Space Center was built was donated by Rice University. Following this, President John F. Kennedy made a speech at Rice Stadium calling on the United States of America to develop its space program further.

Rice is also known for its emphasis on undergraduate education. The Wiess School of Natural Sciences offers research experiences for its students. The premedical students, in particular, benefit from the nearby Texas Medical Center, which offers many research opportunities. The school also operates the Betty and Jacob Friedman Holistic Garden, comprising a small urban farm growing fruits and vegetables for the student serveries and demonstration gardens for people with disabilities.

== Organization ==
The Dean of the school is Thomas C. Killian, taking over from Peter J. Rossky in 2021.

The Associate Dean for Research is George N. Phillips, Jr., the Associate Dean for Academic Affairs is Kenton Whitmire, the Associate Dean for Strategic Initiatives is Janet Braam, and the Assistant Dean of Business Operations is Stephanie Post.

The BioSciences department was created in July 2014 upon the merging of the Biochemistry & Cell Biology (BCB) department with the Ecology & Evolutionary Biology (EEB) department.
