= American Crystallographic Association =

American Crystallographic Association, Inc.
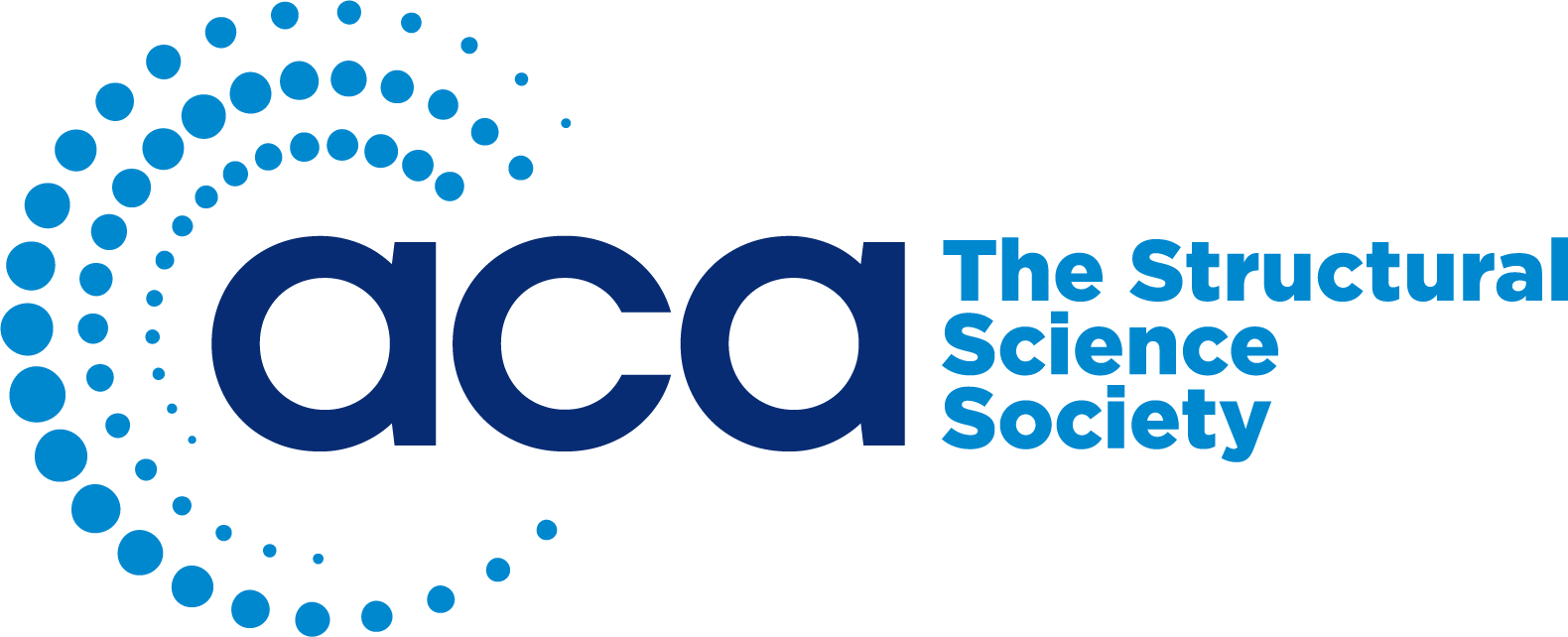
- Abbreviation: ACA
- Formation: 1949; 77 years ago
- Type: Professional association
- Legal status: Scientific Organisation
- Purpose: Promote interactions among scientists who study the structure of matter at atomic resolution
- Headquarters: Buffalo, New York, United States
- Region served: Worldwide
- Members: 2,200 in > 60 countries
- President: Allen Oliver
- Vice-President: Gerald Audette
- Website: www.amercrystalassn.org

The American Crystallographic Association, Inc. (ACA) is a non-profit, scientific organization for scientists who study the structure of matter via crystallographic methodologies. Since its founding in 1949 it has amassed over 2,000 members worldwide.

The association meets annually in July and has several interest groups dealing with specific aspects of crystallography, including fiber diffraction, electron diffraction, neutron scattering, and powder diffraction.

A quarterly magazine, called ACA RefleXions, is published in addition to a scholarly journal. Structural Dynamics is a peer-reviewed, open access, online-only journal co-published by ACA and AIP Publishing. It highlights research articles on structural determination and dynamics of systems, enabled by the emerging new instruments (e.g. XFELs, high harmonic generation, ultra-short electron sources, etc.) and new experimental and theoretical methodologies. The journal is accepting short communications, topical reviews, and research papers in the following topics: Experimental Methodologies, Theory and Modeling, Surfaces and Interfaces, Materials, Liquids and Solutions, and Biological Systems.

The association presents several awards.

== Past presidents ==
Past presidents of the association are listed below. The vice-president from the previous year becomes president in the current year.

- Isidor Fankuchen (1950)
- Ralph Wyckoff (1951)
- Paul Peter Ewald (1952)
- Lawrence O. Brockway (1953)
- Edward Wesley Hughes (1954)
- William Lipscomb (1955)
- Joseph D. H. Donnay (1956)
- Elizabeth A. Wood (1957)
- Dan McLachlan, Jr (1958)
- Robert E. Rundle (1959)
- Jürg Waser (1960)
- Kenneth N. Trueblood (1961)
- Verner Schomaker (1962)
- George A. Jeffrey (1963)
- Howard T. Evans, Jr (1964)
- Henri A. Levy (1965)
- Benjamin Post (1966)
- John S. Kasper (1967)
- Sidney C. Abrahams (1968)
- Walter Clark Hamilton (1969)
- David P. Shoemaker (1970)
- William R. Busing (1971)
- Jerome Karle (1972)
- Robert A. Young (1973)
- Edward C. Lingafelter (1974)
- Robinson D. Burbank (1975)
- Isabella Karle (1976)
- Carroll K. Johnson (1977)
- Philip Coppens (1978)
- Jenny Glusker (1979)
- Harold W. Wyckoff (1980)
- Quintin C. Johnson (1981)
- Jerome B. Cohen (1982)
- David Sayre (1983)
- David H. Templeton (1984)
- Robert E. Newnham (1985)
- William L. Duax (1986)
- Charles E. Bugg (1987)
- Helen M. Berman (1988)
- Bryan M. Craven (1989)
- David J. Duchamp (1990)
- Judith Flippen-Anderson (1991)
- Keith D. Watenpaugh (1992)
- Richard E. Marsh (1993)
- Elinor T. Adman (1994)
- Hugo Steinfink (1995)
- Carol P. Huber (1996)
- Jon Clardy (1997)
- Penelope W. Codding (1998)
- Abraham Clearfield (1999)
- Connie G. Chidester (2000)
- William C. Stallings (2001)
- Charles W. Carter, Jr (2002)
- Raymond E. Davis (2003)
- Frances Jurnak (2004)
- Louis T. J. Delbaere (2005)
- Robert Bau (2006)
- A. Alan Pinkerton (2007)
- Marvin L. Hackert (2008)
- Robert Von Dreele (2009)
- Judith A. Kelly (2010)
- Thomas Koetzle (2011)
- George N. Phillips, Jr. (2012)
- Cheryl Stevens (2013)
- Martha Teeter (2014)
- Christopher Cahill (2015)
- Thomas Terwilliger (2016)
- Amy Sarjeant (2017)
- Lisa Keefe (2018)
- Joseph D. Ferrara (2019)
- Brian Toby (2020)
- David Rose (2021)
- Diana Tomchick (2022)
- Cora Lind-Kovacs (2023)
- Allen Oliver (2024)
- Gerald Audette (2025)

== See also ==
- British Crystallographic Association
- German Crystallographic Society
