= David Sayre =

American X-ray crystallographer

- Born: March 2, 1924; New York, New York
- Died: February 23, 2012 (aged 87); Bridgewater, New Jersey
- Education: Yale University; Oxford University
- Known for: Sayre equation X-ray microscopy Coherent diffraction imaging FORTRAN
- Awards: Ewald Prize
- Scientific career
- Fields: X-ray crystallography X-ray microscopy
- Workplaces: IBM; Stony Brook University
- Doctoral advisor: Dorothy Hodgkin
- Doctoral students: Jianwei (John) Miao
- Other notable students: Henry N. Chapman

David Sayre (March 2, 1924 – February 23, 2012) was an American scientist, credited with the early development of direct methods for protein crystallography and of diffraction microscopy (also called coherent diffraction imaging). While working at IBM he was part of the initial team of ten programmers who created FORTRAN, and later suggested the use of electron beam lithography for the fabrication of X-ray Fresnel zone plates.

The International Union of Crystallography awarded Sayre the Ewald Prize in 2008 for the "unique breadth of his contributions to crystallography, which range from seminal contributions to the solving of the phase problem to the complex physics of imaging generic objects by X-ray diffraction and microscopy(...)".

== Life and career ==
Sayre was born in New York City. He completed his bachelor's degree in physics at Yale University at the age of 19. After working on radar at the wartime Radiation Laboratory at MIT, he earned his MS degree at Auburn University in 1948. In 1949, he moved to Oxford with his wife Anne Colquhoun, whom he had married in 1947. Sayre completed his doctoral studies in Dorothy Hodgkin's group in 1951. It is at this time that Sayre discovered the equation now named after him, based on the concept of atomicity. Although the key to most direct methods still in use today, Sayre did not share the 1985 chemistry Nobel prize awarded for their discovery. It is also around this time that Sayre, inspired by Claude Shannon's recent work, suggested in a short paper that the crystallographic phase problem could be solved more easily if one could measure intensities at a higher density than imposed by Bragg's law. This insight is widely seen as the initial spark that lead to recent lensless imaging techniques.

Back in United States, David Sayre worked on structure determination of a carcinogen molecule in the lab of Peter Friedlander at the University of Pennsylvania in Philadelphia. The structure determination program he wrote for the IBM 701 attracted the attention of John Backus, who hired him to be part of the initial team of 10 programmers that developed the high-level programming language FORTRAN at IBM for the IBM 704 mainframe. Sayre remained at IBM until his retirement in 1990. In the early 1970s, Sayre became interested in X-ray microscopy. He suggested to use the newly developed electron beam lithography apparatus at IBM to produce Fresnel zone plates, a type of X-ray lens now widely used in Synchrotron facilities. In the '80s, he came back to the goal of achieving lensless imaging, which he pursued the rest of his life.
