= Critical Reviews in Biochemistry and Molecular Biology =

- Discipline: Biochemistry, molecular biology
- Language: English
- Edited by: Michael M. Cox

Publication details
- History: 1972-present
- Publisher: Taylor and Francis Group (UK)
- Frequency: Bi-monthly
- Impact factor: 7.714 (2014)

Standard abbreviations
- ISO 4: Crit. Rev. Biochem. Mol. Biol.

Indexing
- ISSN: 1040-9238 (print); 1549-7798 (web)

Links
- Journal homepage

Critical Reviews in Biochemistry and Molecular Biology is a bimonthly scientific journal that publishes comprehensive review articles in the areas of biochemistry and molecular biology. It was established in 1972 under the name Critical Reviews in Biochemistry, obtaining its current name in 1989. It is published by Taylor and Francis Group and the editor-in-chief is Bridget Sheppard. According to the Journal Citation Reports, the journal has a 2014 impact factor of 7.714. The impact factor in 2026 was 6.4.
