= Frederic Schiller Lee =

American physiologist (1859–1939)

- Born: June 16, 1859; Canton, New York
- Died: December 14, 1939 (aged 80)
- Resting place: Woodstock, Vermont
- Education: St. Lawrence University, Johns Hopkins University
- Scientific career
- Fields: Physiology
- Workplaces: Columbia University
- Doctoral advisor: H. Newell Martin

Frederic Schiller Lee (1859-1939) was an American physiologist who spent most of his research career at Columbia University's College of Physicians and Surgeons.

== Early life and education ==
Lee was born on June 16, 1859, in Canton, New York, one of five children born to Reverend John Stebbins Lee and his wife Elmina. The elder Lee served as the first president of St. Lawrence University, from which Frederic received his bachelor's degree in 1878. (Frederic's brother, John Clarence, would go on to serve as the university's fifth president.) Frederic Lee received his Ph.D. from Johns Hopkins University in 1885 under the supervision of H. Newell Martin.

== Academic career ==
After finishing his Ph.D., Lee traveled to Germany to work in the laboratory of distinguished physiology researcher Carl Ludwig in Leipzig for a year, where he developed an interest in the physiological mechanisms of fatigue and in electrophysiology. He then returned to the United States, spent a year as an instructor of biology at St. Lawrence, and then moved to an instructorship in histology and physiology at Bryn Mawr College. Lee was elected to the American Physiological Society at the first APS meeting in 1888.

Lee began his career at Columbia in 1891 as a demonstrator for John Green Curtis, tasked with developing a new, practical laboratory course in physiology. Lee became an adjunct professor at Columbia in 1895, a professor in the physiology department in 1904, and the Dalton Professor of Physiology in 1904. He served as the physiology department's executive officer from 1911 to 1920. Lee retired from Columbia, assuming professor emeritus status, in 1938.

Throughout his career, Lee was deeply involved in the American Physiological Society, serving as its 7th president from 1917-18, accumulating seventeen years as a member of its council, and serving shorter periods in various other administrative roles. Lee was noted for his interest in applying physiology research to war-related work during World War I; he held the role of consulting physiologist for the United States Public Health Service from 1917 to 1919 and of senior physiologist from 1919 to 1924. During the war, he oversaw studies of the physiology of worker fatigue (which led to recruiting a young Albert Baird Hastings to Columbia), and published this work in the book The Human Machine and Industrial Efficiency in 1919.

== Personal life ==
Lee spent many years engaged with the governance of the New York Botanical Gardens, serving 24 years on its board of managers, two years as its vice president, and four years as its president, starting his term in 1923. He was also a trustee of the Columbia University Press and served as a member of the board of directors of an Arizona sanitorium. Lee died on December 14, 1939, following a long illness.
