= Philip J. Elving =

American chemist (1913–1984)

Philip Juliber Elving
- Born: March 14, 1913; Brooklyn, New York, US
- Died: March 16, 1984 (aged 71); Ann Arbor, Michigan, US
- Education: Princeton University
- Scientific career
- Fields: Analytical chemistry
- Workplaces: University of Michigan

Philip Juliber Elving (March 14, 1913 – March 16, 1984) was an American chemist who served on the faculty of Pennsylvania State University, Purdue University, and most notably the University of Michigan, where he was the Hobart Willard Professor of Chemistry. He retired from Michigan, assuming professor emeritus status, in 1983. His research was primarily in analytical chemistry, a subject he also taught for many years at Michigan. Along with I. M. Kolthoff and J. D. Winefordner, he co-edited two popular series of monographs on analytical chemistry.

== Early life and education ==
Elving was born on March 14, 1913, in Brooklyn, New York. He attended Princeton University as an undergraduate and remained there for graduate work, receiving his Ph.D. in 1937.

== Academic career ==
Elving taught chemistry at Pennsylvania State University and later at Purdue University after receiving his Ph.D. He then spent several years in private industry at Publicker Industries.

In 1952, Elving joined the faculty at the University of Michigan, where he would remain for the rest of his career. He received the university's Distinguished Faculty Achievement Award in 1977 and became the Hobart Willard Professor of Chemistry in 1981. During his tenure he served on a number of university committees and organized student study-abroad programs; noted for his deep religious conviction he was also a long-serving member of the university's Committee for Studies in Religion. He retired, assuming professor emeritus status, in 1983.

Elving was particularly well known for his work as the co-editor of two large series of monographs on topics in analytical chemistry. Treatise on Analytical Chemistry was co-edited with noted analytical chemist I. M. Kolthoff and Chemical Analysis included Elving, Kolthoff, and J. D. Winefordner. The Treatise was broadly reviewed as an important and high-quality reference work. He also served in a number of leadership roles with the American Chemical Society's Division of Analytical Chemistry and was a member of the board of directors of the Electrochemical Society.

Elving died on March 16, 1984, aged 71, of liver cancer. A professorship in his name has been established at Michigan; currently the Elving Professor of Chemistry is Mark Meyerhoff.

== Research ==
Elving's research focused on analytical chemistry, particularly electrochemistry as applied to biologically important molecules such as purines and pyrimidines.

== Awards and honors ==
- Anachem Award, Association of Analytical Chemists, 1957
- Fisher Award in Analytical Chemistry, American Chemical Society, 1960
- Medaille de Honneur, Université de Liège, 1965
- Distinguished Faculty Achievement Award, University of Michigan, 1977
