= Sayre equation =

In crystallography, the Sayre equation, named after David Sayre who introduced it in 1952, is a mathematical relationship that allows one to calculate probable values for the phases of some diffracted beams. It is used when employing direct methods to solve a structure. Its formulation is the following:

$$F_{hkl} = \sum_{h'k'l'} F_{h'k'l'}F_{h-h',k-k',l-l'}$$

which states how the structure factor for a beam can be calculated as the sum of the products of pairs of structure factors whose indices sum to the desired values of $h,k,l$. Since weak diffracted beams will contribute a little to the sum, this method can be a powerful way of finding the phase of related beams, if some of the initial phases are already known by other methods.

In particular, for three such related beams in a centrosymmetric structure, the phases can only be 0 or $\pi$ and the Sayre equation reduces to the triplet relationship:

$$S_{h} \approx S_{h'} S_{h-h'}$$

where the $S$ indicates the sign of the structure factor (positive if the phase is 0 and negative if it is $\pi$) and the $\approx$ sign indicates that there is a certain degree of probability that the relationship is true, which becomes higher the stronger the beams are.
