= Erda =

Erda may refer to:

- Earth
- Erda, Utah
- Elastic recoil detection analysis
- Erda or Urðr, often confused with the goddess Jörð, in Richard Wagner's opera cycle Der Ring des Nibelungen (The Ring of the Nibelung)
- Energy Research and Development Administration
- El Rostro de Analía (Analia's Face), a Spanish-language telenovela produced in United States
- 894 Erda
