= Asteroid ion beam deflection =

Planetary defense proposal

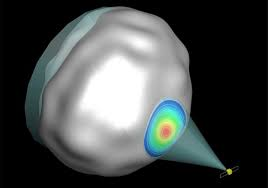
IBS spacecraft deflecting an asteroid

Ion beam deflection (IBD) is a contactless method to deflect a space object, typically a potentially hazardous asteroid, using one or more ion-beam shepherd (IBS) spacecraft hovering near the object being deflected and pointing an ion beam towards the object surface. The impinging ions create a transmitted deflection force without physical contact with it. The concept was first proposed in 2011 by C. Bombardelli and J. Peláez from the Technical University of Madrid (UPM) as a slow-push method for asteroid deflection. In 2024, it was investigated with the aim of a possible contactless asteroid deflection demonstration mission.

== Comparison with other deflection methods ==
Like the gravity tractor, the IBD method exerts a continuous slow-push deflection that bears no risk of fragmenting the object being deflected and allows one to accurately control its final orbit in order to guarantee a safe deflection. However, the magnitude of the deflection force being transmitted only depends on the capability of the electric propulsion system onboard and it is independent of the size of the asteroid. This greatly reduces the required IBS spacecraft mass compared to the gravity tractor the more so the smaller the asteroid. A kinetic impactor (KI), on the other hand, cannot accurately control the achieved deflection, as it depends on the unknown amount and velocity distribution of the ejected material, and poses a significant risk of fragmenting the target the more so the smaller its size. Nevertheless, the deflection capability of a single kinetic impactor tends to be higher than what an IBS can achieve. Several IBS spacecraft to act simultaneously would be required in order to match the deflection capability of a single KI, which complicates the mission design. Finally, not having been validated yet in orbit, an IBD method has significantly lower technology readiness level (TRL) than a KI.

== Technological challenges ==
The main technological challenge of an IBD method are the need for autonomous and stable hovering during weeks or months as required in order to build up enough deflection momentum.

== See also ==
- Asteroid impact avoidance
