= James W. Mayer =

American physical chemist

- Born: April 24, 1930; Chicago, Illinois, US
- Died: June 14, 2013 (aged 83); Kailua-Kona, Hawaii
- Citizenship: American
- Education: Purdue University (BS, PhD)
- Scientific career
- Fields: Applied Physics; Electrical Engineering
- Workplaces: Hughes Research Laboratories; California Institute of Technology; Cornell University; Arizona State University
- Thesis: Performance of Germanium and Silicon Surface-Barrier Diodes as Alpha-Particle Spectrometers (1960)
- Doctoral advisors: Hubert M. James

James Walter Mayer (April 24, 1930 – June 14, 2013) was an applied physicist, who was active in the field of ion-solid interactions. His accomplishments played a critical role in the development of the solid-state particle detector; the field of ion beam analysis of materials, and the application of ion implantation to semiconductors.

== Early life and education ==
Mayer was born on April 24, 1930 in Chicago. He went to Purdue University to earn a Bachelor of Science degree in mechanical engineering in 1952. He entered the graduate program in physics at Purdue to work under solid-state physicist Ben R. Gossick. A short time later, Mayer had to change research advisors when Gossick decided to leave Purdue. Karl Lark-Horovitz became Mayer's new advisor upon Gossick's departure. Before Mayer was able to complete his thesis work, department chair Hubert M. James became Mayer's third thesis supervisor after Lark-Horovitz's death in 1958. Mayer was able to earn his PhD in 1960.

== Career ==
He gained a PhD degree in physics from Purdue University and worked at Hughes Research Laboratories before moving in 1967 to the California Institute of Technology as professor of electrical engineering. He joined Cornell University as professor of materials science and engineering in 1980, and was made director of the microscience and technology program in 1989. Moving to Arizona State University in 1992, he served as director of the Center for Solid State Science before being appointed regents professor (1994) and P.V. Galvin Professor of Science & Engineering (1997).

== Semiconductor spectrometer ==
It was known in the 1950s that semiconductor p-n junctions responded to alpha particles by producing voltage pulses. However, the common method of determining the energy spectrum of energetic particles at that time relied on the use of very large and cumbersome magnetic spectrometers and ionization chambers. It was at this time in the mid to late 1950s that James Mayer demonstrated the first semiconductor, broad area, spectrometer which measured the energies of the particles rather than just detecting their impact. Mayer's discovery was that the ionization of Si and Ge by charged particles (as well as X-rays) could be used, in a small, compact device, to collect the electrons and holes that were created and thereby measure the energy of the incident particles.

The concept of the surface-barrier particle detector that Mayer first developed served as a cornerstone for the rapid development of numerous research areas. Because of its small size and compactness, the surface-barrier particle detector almost immediately started replacing many of the cumbersome detectors in use at that time, i.e. magnetic spectrometers and ionization chambers, revolutionizing low energy nuclear structure physics almost overnight. These semiconductor spectrometers led to the practical development of many modern materials analysis techniques that have wide spread use today, such as X-ray fluorescence and ion beam analysis of materials, including Rutherford backscattering, ion channeling, and X-ray spectrometry based on alpha particle sources.

== Particle detectors ==
Mayer played a pivotal role in the application of particle detectors to the fledgling field of ion beam analysis (often referred to as Rutherford Backscattering Spectrometry or RBS) and the development of this field into a major analytical tool. He went on to define many of the advances in thin film science of the 1970s and 80s, including thin film reactions and kinetics (especially of metal silicides), solid phase regrowth of semiconductors, ion beam mixing for the formation of metastable alloys, implantation disorder and impurity location in semiconductors, and the study of thin dielectric films.

In the rapid surge of industrial interest in ion implantation of Si, starting around 1965, Mayer and his coworkers used ion channeling to understand defect production during dopant ion implantation into Si, the recovery of this damage, and the activation of dopants during subsequent anneals, thereby making ion implantation a viable tool for the production of integrated circuits. In 1967, he was chosen by Academic Press to author the first monograph on Ion Implantation of Semiconductors and by 1970 ion implantation first began being used in the commercial production of integrated circuits.

== Papers and books ==
His work resulted in more than 750 papers and 12 books which have garnered in excess of 17,000 citations (ISI listed him as one of the 1000 most-cited Contemporary Scientists between 1965 and 1978). He mentored 40 PhD students and numerous postdoctoral scholars during his academic career at Caltech, Cornell and Arizona State University.

== Awards and honors ==
He was elected a Fellow of the American Physical Society in 1972.

Mayer was awarded the 1981 Von Hippel Award by the Materials Research Society.

He was elected to the National Academy of Engineering in 1984, in the Materials section.
