= Low-energy ion scattering =

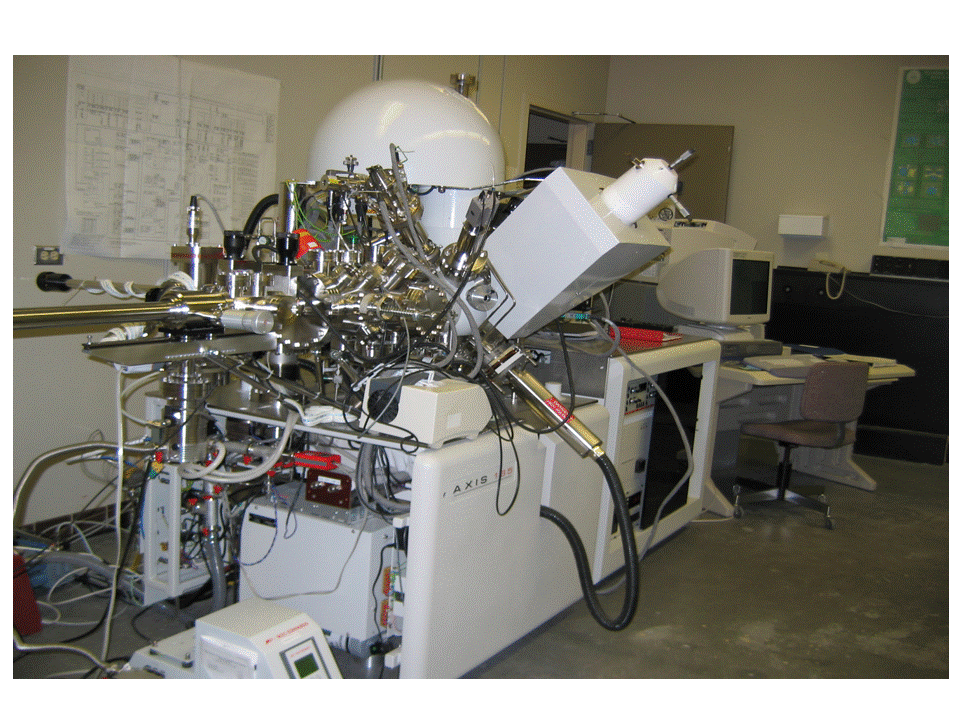
Image of a Kratos Axis-165 system equipped with XPS, ISS, and AES, from Alberta Centre for Surface Engineering and Science (ACSES).

Low-energy ion scattering spectroscopy (LEIS), sometimes referred to simply as ion scattering spectroscopy (ISS), is a surface-sensitive analytical technique used to characterize the chemical and structural makeup of materials. LEIS involves directing a stream of charged particles known as ions at a surface and making observations of the positions, velocities, and energies of the ions that have interacted with the surface. Data that is thus collected can be used to deduce information about the material such as the relative positions of atoms in a surface lattice and the elemental identity of those atoms. LEIS is closely related to both medium-energy ion scattering (MEIS) and high-energy ion scattering (HEIS, known in practice as Rutherford backscattering spectroscopy, or RBS), differing primarily in the energy range of the ion beam used to probe the surface. While much of the information collected using LEIS can be obtained using other surface science techniques, LEIS is unique in its sensitivity to both structure and composition of surfaces. Additionally, LEIS is one of a very few surface-sensitive techniques capable of directly observing hydrogen atoms, an aspect that may make it an increasingly more important technique as the hydrogen economy is being explored.

== Experimental setup ==
LEIS systems consist of the following:

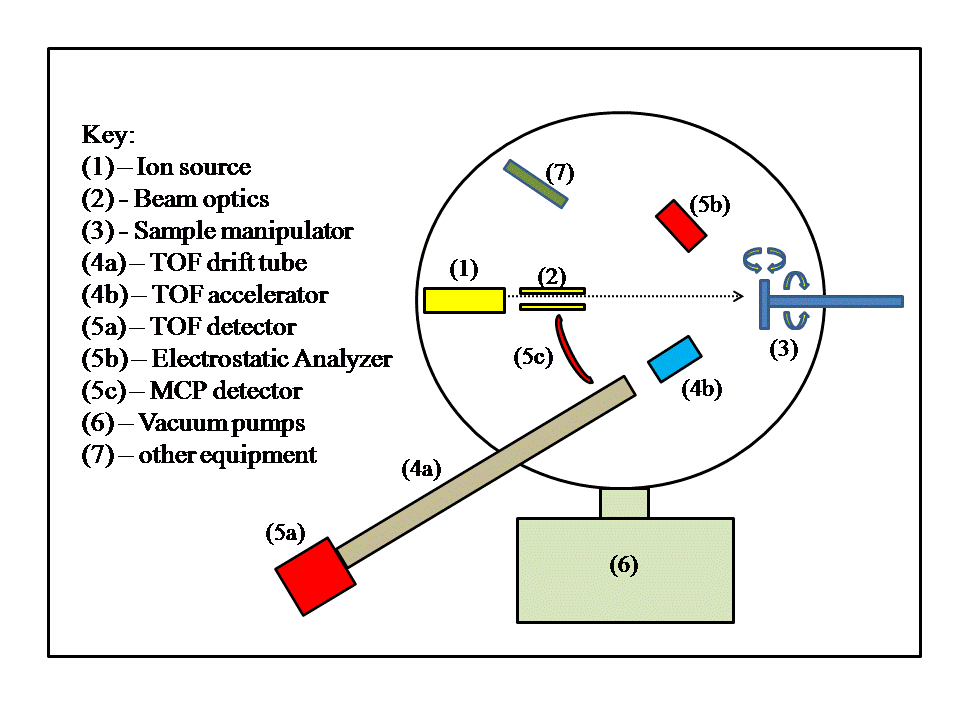
General experimental setup for LEIS.

1. Ion Gun, used to direct a beam of ions at a target sample. An electron ionization ion source is typically used to ionize noble gas atoms such as He, Ne or Ar, while heating of wafers containing alkali atoms is used to create an alkali ion beam. The ions thus created hold a positive charge, typically +1, due to the ejection of electrons from the atoms. The range of energies used most often in LEIS is 500 eV to 20 keV. In order to attain good experimental resolution it is important to have a narrow energy spread (ΔE/E < 1%) in the outgoing ion beam.
2. Ion beam manipulator, includes the electrostatic lenses of the ion gun for focusing and beam-chopping. Lenses consist of a series of either plate or cylinder geometries and serve to collimate the beam as well as to selectively filter the beam based on mass and velocity. Beam chopping is performed using a pulsed-wave generator when time-of-flight (TOF) experiments are performed. Ions only pass through the chopper when there is no applied voltage.
3. Sample manipulator, allows an operator to change the position and/or angle of the target in order to perform experiments with varying geometries. Using directional controls, azimuthal (rotational) and incident angle adjustments may be made.
4. Drift tube/drift region, used in TOF setup. TOF measurements are used when analysis of particle velocity is required. By pulsing ions towards the sample with a regular frequency, and observing the time to travel a certain distance after surface impact to a detector, it is possible to calculate the velocity of ions and neutrals coming from the surface. An accelerator may also be used in this setup, prior to the drift tube, in order to achieve separation of ions from neutrals when desired.
5. Detector/electrostatic analyzer, used to detect the velocities and/or energies of scattered particles including ions and, in some cases, neutral species.
  Diagram of an electrostatic analyzer in the hemispherical geometry. Only ions of a selected energy pass through to the detector.
  As opposed to TOF analyzers, electrostatic analyzers achieve ion energy resolution using electrostatic deflectors to direct only ions of a particular energy range into a collector, while all other ions are redirected. This type of analyzer can give good energy resolution (and thus, selectivity) but typically suffers from poor sensitivity due to the fact that it only detects ions of a certain energy range and ignores neutral species altogether. Two types of detectors are used: channel electron multiplier (CEM) and microchannel plate (MCP) detectors. CEMs operate in a similar manner to photomultipliers, displaying a cascade of secondary electron emission processes initiated by ion or fast neutral (energy > 1 keV) impact to give a gain in signal current. In this way it is possible to efficiently detect even small ion or neutral particle fluxes. MCP detectors are essentially 2-dimensional arrays of CEMs, and they allow additional information about particle position to be obtained at the cost of sensitivity at any given position.
6. Vacuum pumps; Studies are performed in ultra-high vacuum (UHV) conditions (< 10^{−10} torr) in order to prevent unwanted interference with the ion beam and/or sample. Common UHV pumps include turbomolecular and ion pumps, with roughing pumping typically performed using a rotary vane pump. Due to the extreme surface (i.e. first-layer) sensitivity of LEIS, samples also need to be rigorously cleaned prior to analysis. Some common processes used to clean samples include sputtering and annealing. Appropriate equipment for cleaning must be contained within the vacuum chamber.
7. Other analysis tools; in many cases it is desirable to perform multiple types of analysis on a sample within the same UHV system, or even at the same time. Some additional tools may include Auger electron spectroscopy (AES), low-energy electron diffraction (LEED), and x-ray photoelectron spectroscopy (XPS). Use of these tools typically requires the presence of additional detectors as well as electron and/or x-ray sources where applicable.

== Physics of ion-surface interactions ==
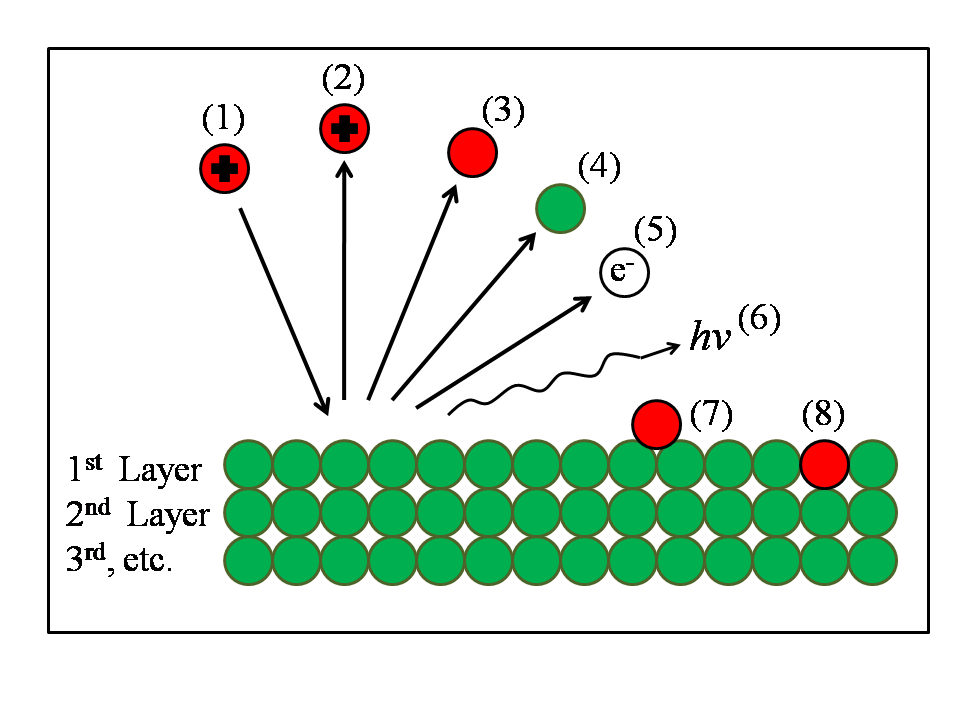
Diagram of various ion-surface interactions (non-exhaustive). (1) Incoming ion; (2) Scattering; (3) Neutralization and scattering; (4) Sputtering or recoiling; (5) Electron emission; (6) Photon emission; (7) Adsorption; (8) Displacement. LEIS is unique in its high sensitivity to the first surface layer in a sample.

Several different types of events may take place as a result of the ion beam impinging on a target surface. Some of these events include electron or photon emission, electron transfer (both ion-surface and surface-ion), scattering, adsorption, and sputtering (i.e. ejection of atoms from the surface). For each system and each interaction there exists an interaction cross-section, and the study of these cross-sections is a field in its own right. As the name suggests, LEIS is primarily concerned with scattering phenomena.

=== Elemental composition and two-body collision model ===
Due to the energy range typically used in ion scattering experiments (> 500 eV), effects of thermal vibrations, phonon oscillations, and interatomic binding are ignored since they are far below this range (~a few eV), and the interaction of particle and surface may be thought of as a classical two-body elastic collision problem. Measuring the energy of ions scattered in this type of interaction can be used to determine the elemental composition of a surface, as is shown in the following:

Two-body elastic collisions are governed by the concepts of energy and momentum conservation. Consider a particle with mass m_{x}, velocity v_{0}, and energy given as $E_0 = \tfrac {1}{2} m_x v_0^2 \,\!$ impacting another particle at rest with mass m_{y}. The energies of the particles after collision are $E_1 = \tfrac {1}{2} m_x v_1^2 \,\!$ and $E_2 = \tfrac {1}{2} m_y v_2^2 \,\!$ where $E_0 = E_1 + E_2 \,\!$ and thus $\tfrac{1}{2} m_x v_0^2 = \tfrac{1}{2} m_x v_1^2 + \tfrac{1}{2} m_y v_2^2 \,\!$. Additionally, we know $m_x v_0 = m_x v_1 \cos \theta_1 + m_y v_2 \cos \theta_2 \,\!$. Using trigonometry we are able to determine

$E_1 = E_0 \left( \frac{m_x \cos \theta_1 \pm \sqrt{m_y^2 - m_x^2 \sin^2 \theta_1}}{m_x + m_y} \right)^2$

Similarly, we know

$E_2 = E_0 \left (\frac{4 m_x m_y cos^2 (\theta_1)}{(m_x + m_y)^2} \right)$

In a well-controlled experiment the energy and mass of the primary ions (E_{0} and m_{x}, respectively) and the scattering or recoiling geometries are all known, so determination of surface elemental composition is given by the correlation between E_{1} or E_{2} and m_{y}. Higher energy scattering peaks correspond to heavier atoms and lower energy peaks correspond to lighter atoms.

=== Getting quantitative ===
While obtaining qualitative information about the elemental composition of a surface is relatively straightforward, it is necessary to understand the statistical cross-section of interaction between ion and surface atoms in order to obtain quantitative information. Stated another way, it is easy to find out if a particular species is present, but much more difficult to determine how much of this species is there.

The two-body collision model fails to give quantitative results as it ignores the contributions of coulomb repulsion as well as the more complicated effects of charge screening by electrons. This is generally less of a problem in MEIS and RBS experiments but presents issues in LEIS. Coulomb repulsion occurs between positively charged primary ions and the nuclei of surface atoms. The interaction potential is given as:

$V(r) = \frac{Z_1 Z_2 e^2}{r} \phi (r) \qquad (1)$

Where $Z_1 \,\!$ and $Z_2 \,\!$ are the atomic numbers of the primary ion and surface atom, respectively, $e \,\!$ is the elementary charge, $r \,\!$ is the interatomic distance, and $\phi (r) \,\!$ is the screening function. $\phi (r) \,\!$ accounts for the interference of the electrons orbiting each nucleus. In the case of MEIS and RBS, this potential can be used to calculate the Rutherford scattering cross section (see Rutherford scattering) $\tfrac {d \sigma}{d \Omega}$:

Repulsive scattering by a point particle.

$\frac{d \sigma}{d \Omega} = \left (\frac{Z_1 Z_2 e^2}{4 E_0} \right)^2 \frac{1}{\sin ^4 \left (\frac{\theta}{2} \right)} \qquad (2)$

As shown at right, $d \sigma \,\!$ represents a finite region for an incoming particle, while $d \Omega \,\!$ represents the solid scattering angle after the scattering event. However, for LEIS $\phi (r) \,\!$ is typically unknown which prevents such a clean analysis. Additionally, when using noble gas ion beams there is a high probability of neutralization on impact (which has strong angular dependence) due to the strong desire of these ions to be in a neutral, closed shell state. This results in poor secondary ion flux. See AISS and TOF-SARS below for approaches to avoiding this problem.

=== Shadowing and blocking ===
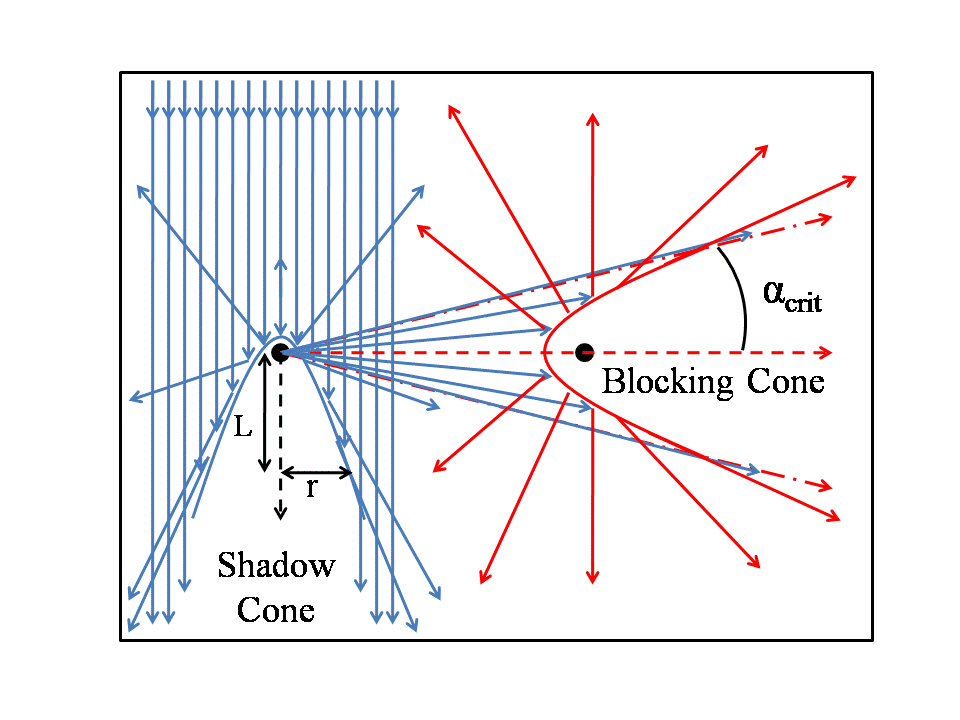
Shadowing and blocking effects in two dimensions. No ions will be detected at angles below $\alpha_{crit}. \,\!$ Primary ions are approaching from the upper left.

Shadowing and blocking are important concepts in almost all types of ion-surface interactions and result from the repulsive nature of the ion-nucleus interaction. As shown at right, when a flux of ions flows in parallel towards a scattering center (nucleus), they are each scattered according to the force of the Coulomb repulsion. This effect is known as shadowing. In a simple Coulomb repulsion model, the resulting region of “forbidden” space behind the scattering center takes the form of a paraboloid with radius $r = 2 \sqrt {\tfrac{Z_1 Z_2 e^2 L}{E_0}}$ at a distance L from the scattering center. The flux density is increased near the edge of the paraboloid.

Blocking is closely related to shadowing, and involves the interaction between scattered ions and a neighboring scattering center (as such it inherently requires the presence of at least two scattering centers). As shown, ions scattered from the first nucleus are now on diverging paths as they undergo interaction with the second nucleus. This interaction results in another “shadowing cone” now called a blocking cone where ions scattered from the first nucleus are blocked from exiting at angles below $\alpha_{crit} \,\!$. Focusing effects again result in an increased flux density near $\alpha_{crit} \,\!$.

In both shadowing and blocking, the "forbidden" regions are actually accessible to trajectories when the mass of incoming ions is greater than that of the surface atoms (e.g. Ar^{+} impacting Si or Al). In this case the region will have a finite but depleted flux density.

For higher energy ions such as those used in MEIS and RBS the concepts of shadowing and blocking are relatively straightforward since ion-nucleus interactions dominate and electron screening effects are insignificant. However, in the case of LEIS these screening effects do interfere with ion-nucleus interactions and the repulsive potential becomes more complicated. Also, multiple scattering events are very likely which complicates analysis. Importantly, due to the lower energy ions used LEIS is typically characterized by large interaction cross-sections and shadow cone radii. For this reason penetration depth is low and the method has much higher first-layer sensitivity than MEIS or RBS. Overall, these concepts are essential for data analysis in impact collision LEIS experiments (see below).

=== Diffraction does not play a major role ===
The de Broglie wavelength of ions used in LEIS experiments is given as $\lambda = \tfrac{h}{m v}$. Using a worst-case value of 500 eV for an ^{4}He^{+} ion, we see λ is still only 0.006 Å, still well below the typical interatomic spacing of 2-3 Å. Because of this, the effects of diffraction are not significant in a normal LEIS experiment.

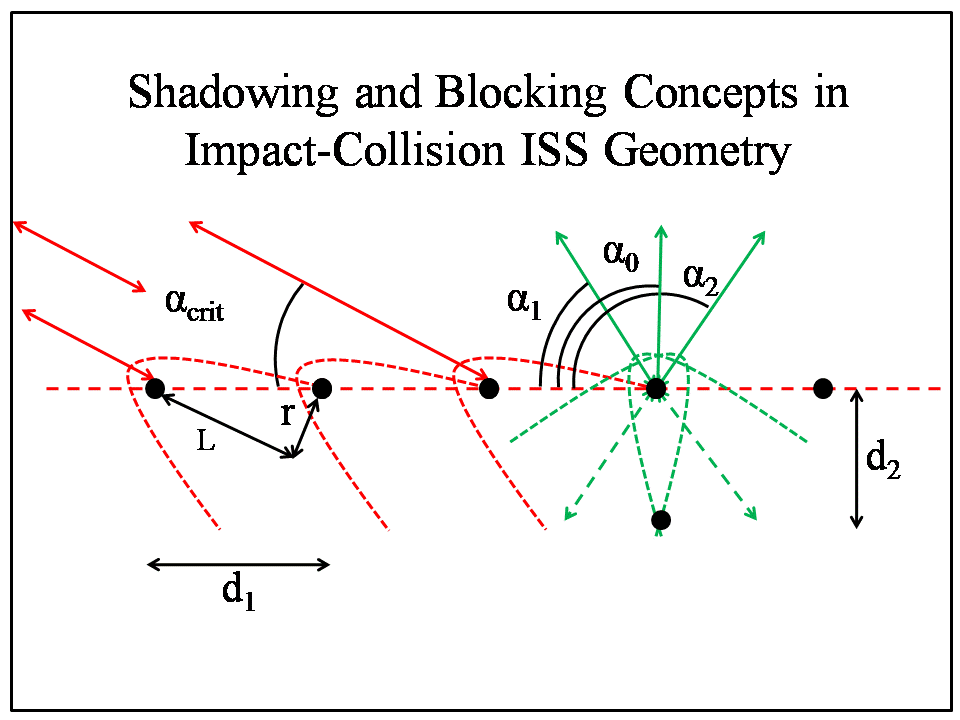
ICISS geometry and its relevance to structural characterization of surfaces. The direction and length of the surface-subsurface bond may be determined from an intensity vs. $\alpha \,\!$ plot. Red: determining the shape of the shadow cone; Green: determining surface-subsurface spacing and direction with a known shadow cone shape.

=== Variations of technique ===
Depending on the particular experimental setup, LEIS may be used to obtain a variety of information about a sample. The following includes several of these methods.

- Alkali ion scattering spectroscopy (AISS) uses alkali ions in place of noble gas ions to give a distinctly different type of interaction. The primary difference between AISS and normal ISS is the increase in ion survival probability when using alkali ions. This is due to the relative stability of alkali (+1) ions as opposed to noble gas ions which have a much stronger energetic incentive for abstracting electrons from the sample. Increasing the ion survival probability results in an increase in ion flux and an improvement in sensitivity, which in turn allows for a reduction in primary ion flux to a point where the method is almost non-destructive. A disadvantage of using alkali ions in place of noble gas ions is the increased likelihood of adsorption or deposition to the sample surface.
- Impact-collision ion scattering spectroscopy (ICISS) takes advantage of shadowing and blocking in order to make precise determinations about interatomic spacing of the first 1-2 layers in a surface. The specific scattering geometry (180 degrees) ensures detection of only those particles which have undergone head-on collisions with surface atoms (thereby avoiding the complications of multiple scattering events). Starting sampling at a relatively high angle of incidence and scanning over varying incidence angles, the intensity of one particular energy peak is monitored. Scattered ions form shadow cones (see above) behind each atom, which prevents any backscattering at low incidence angles. A peak in scattering intensity is observed when the cones line up such that each passes over the adjacent atom. Performing such an analysis on a sample with known interatomic spacing enables determination of the shape of the shadow cone, where as shown at right, $r = d\sin\alpha_{crit}\,\!$ and $L = d\cos\alpha_{crit}\,\!$.
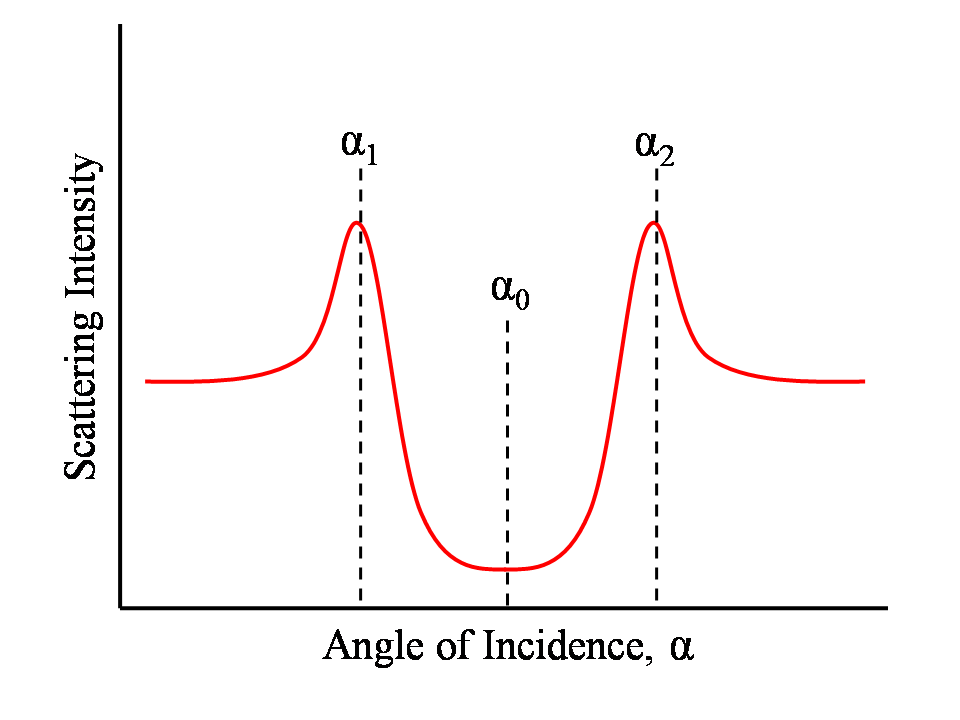
  A graph of intensity versus angle of incidence for scattering from a subsurface atom in the ICISS geometry. The directionality of the surface-subsurface bond (see diagram above) may be deduced from $\alpha_0 \,\!$. The length of this bond may be deduced from $\alpha_1 \,\!$ and $\alpha_2 \,\!$ when the shape of the shadow cone is known.
  If the shape of the shadow cone is known, the interatomic spacing between surface atoms as well as the spacing and directionality between surface and subsurface atoms can then be calculated from the resulting peak-and-valley structure in a graph of intensity versus scattering angle. In the graph at right showing scattering intensity from a subsurface (second layer) atom, $\alpha_0\,\!$ corresponds to the middle of the "valley" where the atom is being blocked by a surface atom. $\alpha_1\,\!$ and $\alpha_2\,\!$ correspond to the peaks due to intersection of the shadow cone with the subsurface atom. Interatomic spacing can be directly calculated from these values if the shape of the shadow cone is known.
- Neutral Impact-collision ion scattering spectroscopy (NICISS) uses detection of backscattered projectiles to determine concentration depth profiles of the elements. The NICISS technique uses noble gas ions (usually He^{+}) of energy 1-5 keV. When the projectile ions are within a few angstrom of the surface they are neutralised, and proceed to penetrate into the surface. The projectiles may be backscattered (at an angle of up to 180°) upon collision with a target atom. This backscattering causes the projectiles to lose energy proportional to the mass of the target and is of the order of a few hundred eV. The final energy of the projectiles is determined via time-of-flight (TOF). Hence by knowing the initial and final energies of the projectile, it is possible to determine the identity of the target atom. The projectiles also experience an additional energy loss while penetrating through the bulk, of the order of a few eV per angstrom. Hence the depth that each target atom was hit can also be determined. From the TOF spectrum it is then possible to gain the concentration depth profiles of the elements present in the sample. NICISS is able to probe to a depth of approximately 20 nm with a resolution of only a few angstrom.
- Reactive ion scattering (RIS) utilizes a stream of very low-energy (1-100 eV) Cs^{+} ions to probe molecules adsorbed at the surface of a sample. Upon impact the ions may interact with and chemically bind to species present at the surface. These interactions take place on a rapid (picosecond) timescale and can be used to analyze for the presence of different molecules or molecular fragments by observing spectra of Cs-X^{+} coming from the surface.
- Time-of-flight scattering and recoiling spectroscopy (TOF-SARS) uses the TOF analysis setup. Elemental analysis may be performed via observation of in-plane scattering, while structural information may be obtained by following certain spectral peaks while shifting either sample incident or azimuthal angle.
- Scattering and recoiling imaging spectroscopy (SARIS) takes advantage of blocking cone geometries to focus ions in a manner similar to conventional optics. This gives very large magnifications (~10^{9}) when projected onto a 2-d detector and may be used to give element-specific images of the sample surface. The use of a wide 2-d MCP detector greatly reduces sample analysis time as opposed to the TOF geometry with an inherently narrow-angle detector (see drift tube above). J. Wayne Rabalais at the University of Houston is one of the pioneers of this method, and a fine image of the output of a SARIS experiment can be found here.

== Comparison to other analytical techniques ==
- Medium energy ion scattering (MEIS) and Rutherford backscattering (RBS) spectroscopies involve a similar setup to LEIS but use ions in the energy range of ~100 keV (MEIS) and ~1-2 MeV (RBS) to probe surfaces. Surface sensitivity is lost as a result of the use of higher energy particles, so while MEIS and RBS can still provide information about a sample they are incapable of providing true first-layer sensitivity.
- Secondary ion mass spectrometry (SIMS) involves the detection of ionic species ejected from a surface as a result of energetic particle impact. While SIMS is capable of giving depth profiles of the elemental and molecular composition of a sample, it is an inherently destructive method and is generally does not give structural information.
- X-ray photoelectron spectroscopy (XPS) is capable of surface elemental analysis, but samples a much more broad region of a sample than LEIS and so is not able to distinguish the first layer from subsurface layers. Since XPS relies on ejection of core-level electrons from atoms it is unable to detect hydrogen or helium atoms in a sample.
- Low-energy electron diffraction (LEED) is often used in combination with LEIS in order to facilitate proper sample alignment. LEED can give detailed structural information about a sample including surface superstructures and alignment of adsorbates. LEED is not element-specific and so cannot be used to determine surface elemental composition.
- Auger electron spectroscopy (AES) involves the detection of electrons emitted as a result of core hole excitation and relaxation processes. Since the process involves core levels it is insensitive to hydrogen and helium atoms. AES results may typically be used to infer information on the chemical environment of particular atoms in a surface.

== See also ==
- List of materials analysis methods
- Surface engineering
- Surface science
