= Microprobe =

A microprobe is an instrument that applies a stable and well-focused beam of charged particles (electrons or ions) to a sample.

== Types ==
When the primary beam consists of accelerated electrons, the probe is termed an electron microprobe, when the primary beam consists of accelerated ions, the term ion microprobe is used. The term microprobe may also be applied to optical analytical techniques, when the instrument is set up to analyse micro samples or micro areas of larger specimens. Such techniques include micro Raman spectroscopy, micro infrared spectroscopy and micro LIBS. All of these techniques involve modified optical microscopes to locate the area to be analysed, direct the probe beam and collect the analytical signal.

A laser microprobe is a mass spectrometer that uses ionization by a pulsed laser and subsequent mass analysis of the generated ions.

== Uses ==
Scientists use this beam of charged particles to determine the elemental composition of solid materials (minerals, glasses, metals). The chemical composition of the target can be found from the elemental data extracted through emitted X-rays (in the case where the primary beam consists of charged electrons) or measurement of an emitted secondary beam of material sputtered from the target (in the case where the primary beam consists of charged ions).

When the ion energy is in the range of a few tens of keV (kilo-electronvolt) these microprobes are usually called FIB (Focused ion beam). An FIB makes a small portion of the material into a plasma; the analysis is done by the same basic techniques as the ones used in mass spectrometry.

When the ion energy is higher, hundreds of keV to a few MeV (mega-electronvolt) they are called nuclear microprobes. Nuclear microprobes are extremely powerful tools that utilize ion beam analysis techniques as microscopies with spot sizes in the micro-/nanometre range. These instruments are applied to solve scientific problems in a diverse range of fields, from microelectronics to biomedicine. In addition to the development of new ways to exploit these probes as analytical tools (this application area of the nuclear microprobes is called nuclear microscopy), strong progress has been made in the area of materials modification recently (most of which can be described as PBW, proton beam writing).

The nuclear microprobe's beam is usually composed of protons and alpha particles. Some of the most advanced nuclear microprobes have beam energies in excess of 2 MeV. This gives the device very high sensitivity to minute concentrations of elements, around 1 ppm at beam sizes smaller than 1 micrometer. This elemental sensitivity exists because when the beam interacts with the a sample it gives off characteristic X-rays of each element present in the sample. This type of detection of radiation is called PIXE. Other analysis techniques are applied to nuclear microscopy including Rutherford backscattering(RBS), STIM, etc.

Another use for microprobes is the production of micro and nano sized devices, as in microelectromechanical systems and nanoelectromechanical systems. The advantage that microprobes have over other lithography processes is that a microprobe beam can be scanned or directed over any area of the sample. This scanning of the microprobe beam can be imagined to be like using a very fine tipped pencil to draw your design on a paper or in a drawing program. Traditional lithography processes use photons which cannot be scanned and therefore masks are needed to selectively expose your sample to radiation. It is the radiation that causes changes in the sample, which in turn allows scientists and engineers to develop tiny devices such as microprocessors, accelerometers (like in most car safety systems), etc.
