= Nuclear reaction analysis =

Nuclear reaction analysis (NRA) is a nuclear method of nuclear spectroscopy in materials science to obtain concentration vs. depth distributions for certain target chemical elements in a solid thin film.

== Mechanism of NRA ==
If irradiated with select projectile nuclei at kinetic energies E_{kin}, target solid thin-film chemical elements can undergo a nuclear reaction under resonance conditions for a sharply defined resonance energy. The reaction product is usually a nucleus in an excited state which immediately decays, emitting ionizing radiation.

To obtain depth information the initial kinetic energy of the projectile nucleus (which has to exceed the resonance energy) and its stopping power (energy loss per distance traveled) in the sample has to be known. To contribute to the nuclear reaction the projectile nuclei have to slow down in the sample to reach the resonance energy. Thus each initial kinetic energy corresponds to a depth in the sample where the reaction occurs (the higher the energy, the deeper the reaction).

== NRA profiling of hydrogen ==
For example, a commonly used reaction to profile hydrogen with an energetic ^{15}N ion beam is

^{15}N + ^{1}H → ^{12}C + α + γ (4.43 MeV)

with a sharp resonance in the reaction cross section at 6.385 MeV of only 1.8 keV. Since the incident ^{15}N ion loses energy along its trajectory in the material it must have an energy higher than the resonance energy to induce the nuclear reaction with hydrogen nuclei deeper in the target.

This reaction is usually written ^{1}H(^{15}N,αγ)^{12}C. It is inelastic because the Q-value is not zero (in this case it is 4.965 MeV). Rutherford backscattering (RBS) reactions are elastic (Q = 0), and the interaction (scattering) cross-section σ given by the famous formula derived by Lord Rutherford in 1911. But non-Rutherford cross-sections (so-called EBS, elastic backscattering spectrometry) can also be resonant: for example, the ^{16}O(α,α)^{16}O reaction has a strong and very useful resonance at 3038.1 ± 1.3 keV.

In the ^{1}H(^{15}N,αγ)^{12}C reaction (or indeed the ^{15}N(p,αγ)^{12}C inverse reaction), the energetic emitted γ ray is characteristic of the reaction and the number that are detected at any incident energy is proportional to the hydrogen concentration at the respective depth in the sample. Due to the narrow peak in the reaction cross section primarily ions of the resonance energy undergo a nuclear reaction. Thus, information on the hydrogen distribution can be straight forward obtained by varying the ^{15}N incident beam energy.

Hydrogen is an element inaccessible to Rutherford backscattering spectrometry since nothing can backscatter from H (since all atoms are heavier than hydrogen!). But it is often analysed by elastic recoil detection.

== Non-resonant NRA ==
NRA can also be used non-resonantly (of course, RBS is non-resonant). For example, deuterium can easily be profiled with a ^{3}He beam without changing the incident energy by using the

^{3}He + D = α + p + 18.353 MeV

reaction, usually written ^{2}H(^{3}He,p)α. The energy of the fast proton detected depends on the depth of the deuterium atom in the sample.

== See also ==
- Rutherford backscattering spectrometry (RBS)
