= 894 Erda =

Main-belt asteroid

Discovery
- Discovered by: M. F. Wolf
- Discovery site: Heidelberg Obs.
- Discovery date: 4 June 1918

Designations
- Named after: Erda, goddess in Wagner's Der Ring des Nibelungen (Norse mythology)
- Alternative designations: A918 LA · 1973 QB; A907 JC · 1907 JC; A912 HD · 1912 HD; 1918 DT
- Minor planet category: main-belt · (outer) background

Orbital characteristics
- Epoch 31 May 2020 (JD 2459000.5)
- Uncertainty parameter 0
- Observation arc: 112.73 yr (41,173 d)
- Aphelion: 3.4642 AU
- Perihelion: 2.7752 AU
- Semi-major axis: 3.1197 AU
- Eccentricity: 0.1104
- Orbital period (sidereal): 5.51 yr (2,013 d)
- Mean anomaly: 150.20°
- Mean motion: 0° 10^{m} 44.04^{s} / day
- Inclination: 12.733°
- Longitude of ascending node: 190.61°
- Argument of perihelion: 116.33°

Physical characteristics
- Mean diameter: 28.309±1.544 km; 36.54±1.8 km; 37.84±0.45 km
- Synodic rotation period: 4.6897±0.0003 h
- Geometric albedo: 0.2300±0.025; 0.232±0.007; 0.319±0.060
- Spectral type: X (S3OS2)
- Absolute magnitude (H): 9.7

894 Erda (prov. designation: A918 LA or 1918 DT) is a bright background asteroid from the outer regions of the asteroid belt. It was discovered on 4 June 1918, by German astronomer Max Wolf at the Heidelberg-Königstuhl State Observatory. The X-type asteroid has a short rotation period of 4.7 hours and measures approximately 37 kilometers (23 miles) in diameter. It was likely named after a character in Wagner's Der Ring des Nibelungen, "Erda", who is the goddess of wisdom, fate and Earth, borrowed from the Norse sagas, and referring to both Urðr and Jörð in Norse mythology.

== Orbit and classification ==
Erda is a non-family asteroid of the main belt's background population when applying the hierarchical clustering method to its proper orbital elements. It orbits the Sun in the outer main-belt at a distance of 2.8–3.5 AU once every 5 years and 6 months (2,013 days; semi-major axis of 3.12 AU). Its orbit has an eccentricity of 0.11 and an inclination of 13° with respect to the ecliptic. On 14 May 1907, the body's observation arc begins as A907 JC (1907 JC ) at Heidelberg; just two nights after its first observation, and more than 11 years prior to its official discovery observation.

== Naming ==
According to The Names of the Minor Planets by Paul Herget in 1955, and adopted by Lutz Schmadel in the Dictionary of Minor Planet Names, this minor planet was named after the Norse goddess described as the "incarnation of the nature", and as "a seer who knows the origin and the destination of all things" (H 87).

The discoverer, Max Wolf, likely adopted the name from Wagner's opera cycle Der Ring des Nibelungen, which is loosely based on figures from the Norse sagas. In Wagner's Ring, the character Erda (Wagner), named after the Old High German word for "Earth", is the goddess of wisdom, fate and Earth. She is the world's wisest woman, the mother of the three Norns and of the valkyrie (shieldmaid) Brunhild, whose father is the norse chief god Odin (Wotan). Wagner, in turn, adopted the name from the treatise Deutsche Mythologie by Jacob Grimm (1785–1863) and other sources. Erda combines attributes of both, Urðr (wisdom and fate) and Jörð (the personification of Earth).

== Physical characteristics ==
In both the Tholen- and SMASS-like taxonomy of the Small Solar System Objects Spectroscopic Survey (S3OS2), Erda is an X-type asteroid.

=== Rotation period ===
In June 2006, a rotational lightcurve of Erda was obtained from photometric observations by David Higgins at Hunters Hill Observatory (E14), Australia, and by Rui Gonçalves at Linhaceira Observatory (938) in Portugal. Lightcurve analysis gave a well-defined rotation period of 4.6897±0.0003 hours with a brightness variation of 0.27±0.02 magnitude, significantly higher than previous observations had measured (U=3). The observers also found no indication of a previously speculated companion.

The result supersedes observations from July 2001, when both Robert Stephens and Laurent Bernasconi determined a period of 4.69±0.01 and 4.69±0.05 hours with an amplitude of 0.05±0.01 and 0.06±0.03 magnitude, respectively.

=== Diameter and albedo ===
According to the survey carried out by the NEOWISE mission of NASA's Wide-field Infrared Survey Explorer (WISE), the Infrared Astronomical Satellite IRAS, and the Japanese Akari satellite, Erda measures (28.309±1.544), (36.54±1.8) and (37.84±0.45) kilometers in diameter and its surface has an albedo of (0.319±0.060), (0.2300±0.025) and (0.232±0.007), respectively. The Collaborative Asteroid Lightcurve Link derives an albedo of 0.1942 and a diameter of 36.26 kilometers based on an absolute magnitude of 9.6. An alternative mean-diameter measurement published by the WISE team gives (51.074±1.760 km) with an albedo of (0.120±0.007). On 17 April 2010, an asteroid occultation gave a best-fit ellipse dimension of 36.00 × 36.0 kilometers, while a second observation on 15 September 2014, measured an ellipse of 38.00 × 38.0 kilometers These timed observations are taken when the asteroid passes in front of a distant star.
