= Elastic recoil detection =

Elastic recoil detection analysis (ERDA), also referred to as forward recoil scattering or spectrometry, is an ion beam analysis technique, in materials science, to obtain elemental concentration depth profiles in thin films. This technique can be achieved using many processes.

In the technique of ERDA, an energetic ion beam is directed at a sample to be characterized and (as in Rutherford backscattering) there is an elastic nuclear interaction between the ions of the beam and the atoms of the target sample. Such interactions are commonly of Coulomb nature. Depending on the kinetics of the ions, cross section area, and the loss of energy of the ions in the matter, ERDA helps determine the quantification of the elemental analysis. It also provides information about the depth profile of the sample.

The energy of incident energetic ions can vary from 2 MeV to 200 MeV, depending on the studied sample. The energy of the beam should be enough to kick out ("recoil") the atoms of the sample. Thus, ERDA usually employs appropriate source and detectors to detect recoiled atoms.

ERDA setup is large, expensive and difficult to operate. Therefore, although it is commercially available, it is relatively uncommon in materials characterization. The angle of incidence that an ion beam makes with the sample must also be taken into account for correct analysis of the sample. This is because, depending on this angle, the recoiled atoms will be collected.

ERDA has been used since 1974. It has similar theory to Rutherford backscattering spectrometry (RBS), but there are minor differences in the set-up of the experiment. In case of RBS, the detector is placed in the back of the sample whereas in ERDA, the detector is placed in the front.

== Characteristics of ERDA ==
The main characteristics of ERDA are listed below.

- A variety of elements can be analyzed simultaneously as long as the atomic number of recoiled ion is smaller than the atomic number of the primary ion.
- The sensitivity of this technique primarily depends upon scattering cross-section area, and the method has almost equal sensitivity to all light elements.
- Depth resolution depends upon stopping power of heavy ions after interactions with sample, and the detection of scattered primary ions is reduced due to the narrow scattering cone of heavy ions scattering from light elements.
- Gaseous ionization detectors provides efficient recoil detection, minimizing the exposure of sample to the ion beam and making this a non-destructive technique. This is important for accurate measurement of hydrogen, which is unstable under the beam and is often removed from the sample.

== History ==
ERDA was first demonstrated by L'Ecuyer et al. in 1976. They used 25–40 MeV ^{35}Cl ions to detect the recoils in the sample. Later, ERDA has been divided into two main groups. First is the light incident ion ERDA (LI-ERDA) and the second is the heavy incident ion ERDA (HI-ERDA). These techniques provide similar information and differ only in the type of ion beam used as a source.

LI-ERDA uses low voltage single-ended accelerators, whereas the HI-ERDA uses large tandem accelerators. These techniques were mainly developed after heavy ion accelerators were introduced in the materials research. LI-ERDA is also often performed using a relatively low energy (2 MeV) helium beam for measuring the depth profile of hydrogen. In this technique, multiple detectors are used: backscattering detector for heavier elements and forward (recoil) detector to simultaneously detect the recoiled hydrogen. The recoil detector for LI-ERDA typically has a "range foil". It is usually a Mylar foil placed in front of the detector, which blocks scattered incident ions, but allows lighter recoiling target atoms to pass through to the detector. Usually a 10 μm thick Mylar foil completely stops 2.6 MeV helium ions but allows the recoiled protons to go through with a low energy loss.

HI-ERDA is more widely used compared to LI-ERDA because it can probe more elements. It is used to detect recoiled target atoms and scattered beam ions using several detectors, such as silicon diode detector, time-of-flight detector, Gaseous ionization detector etc. The main advantage of HI-ERDA is its ability to obtain quantitative depth profiling information of all the sample elements in one measurement. Depth resolution less than 1nm can be obtained with good quantitative accuracy thus giving these techniques significant advantages over other surface analysis methods. Additionally, a depth of 300 nm can be accessed using this technique. A wide range of ion beams including ^{35}Cl, ^{63}Cu, ^{127}I, and ^{197}Au, with different energies can be used in this technique.

The setup and the experimental conditions affect the performances of both of these techniques. Factors such as multiple scattering and ion beam induced damage must be taken into account before obtaining the data because these processes can affect the data interpretation, quantification, and accuracy of the study. Additionally, the incident angle and the scattered angle help determine the sample surface topography.

== Prominent features of ERDA ==
ERDA is very similar to RBS, but instead of detecting the projectile at the back angle, the recoils are detected in the forward direction. Doyle and Peercey in 1979 established the use of this technique for hydrogen depth profiling. Some of the prominent features of ERDA with high energy heavy ions are:

- Large recoil cross-section with heavy ions provides good sensitivity. Moreover, all chemical elements, including hydrogen, can be detected simultaneously with similar sensitivity and depth resolution.
- Concentrations of 0.1 atomic percent can be easily detected. The sampling depth depends on the sample material and is of the order of 1.5–2.5 μm. For the surface region, a depth resolution of 10 nm can be achieved. The resolution deteriorates with increasing depth due to several physical processes, mainly the energy straggling and multiple scattering of the ions in the sample.
- Same recoil cross-section for a wide mass range of target atoms.
- The unique characteristic of this technique is depth-profiling of a wide range of elements from hydrogen to rare earth elements.

ERDA can overcome some of the limitations of RBS. ERDA has enabled depth profiling of elements from lightest elements like hydrogen up to heavy elements with high resolution in the light mass region as discussed above. Also, this technique has been highly sensitive because of the use of large area position sensitive telescope detectors. Such detectors are used especially when the elements in the sample have similar masses.

== Principles of ERDA ==
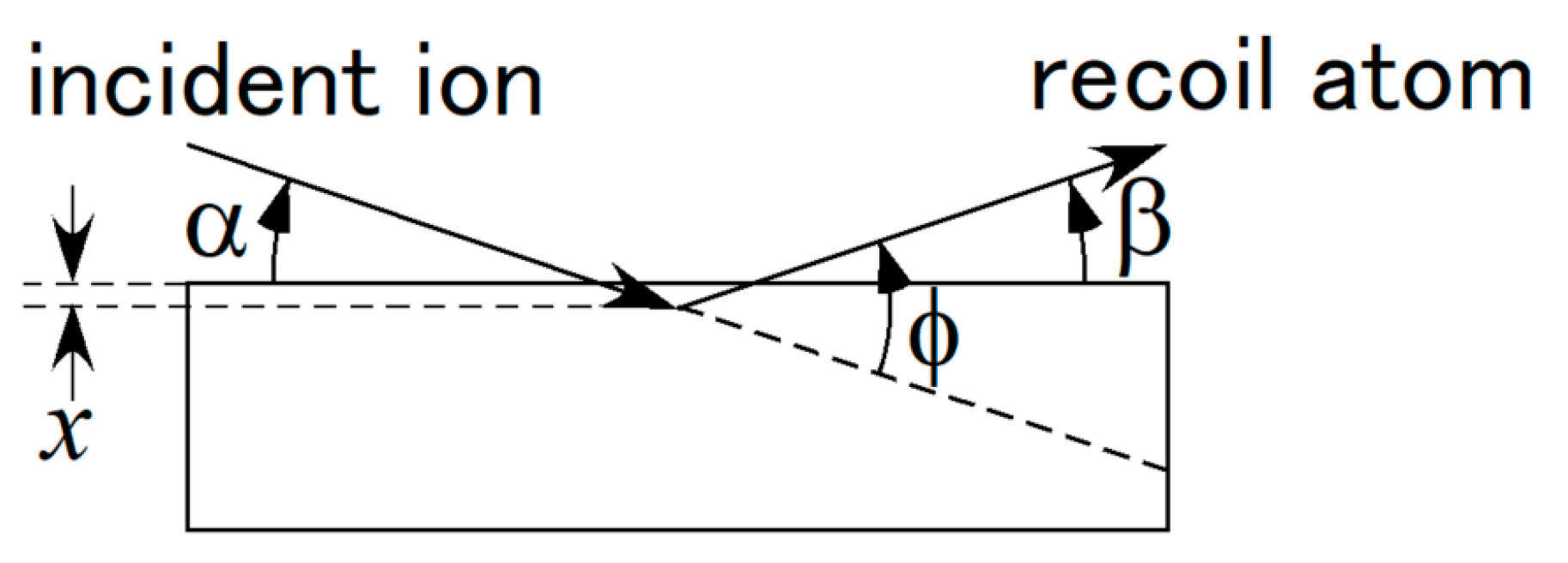
Schematic of ERDA. ϕ, α and β are recoil angle, incident angle, and exit angle, respectively. x is the probing depth.

The calculations that model this process are relatively simple, assuming projectile energy is in the range corresponding to Rutherford scattering. Projectile energy range for light incident ions is in 0.5–3.0 MeV range. For heavier projectile ions such as ^{127}I the energy range is usually between 60 and 120 MeV; and for medium heavy ion beams, ^{36}Cl is a common ion beam used with an energy of approximately 30 MeV. For the instrumentation section, the focus will be on heavy ion bombardment. The E_{2} transferred by projectile ions of mass m_{1} and energy E_{1} to sample atoms of mass m_{2} recoiling at an angle ϕ, with respect to the incidence direction is given by the following equation.

(1) $E_2 = \frac{(4m_1 m_2)}{(m_1 + m_2)^2}(E_1 \cos^2 \phi)$

Eq. 1 models the energy transfer from the incident ions striking the sample atoms and the recoiling effect of the target atoms with an angle of ϕ. For heavier ions in elastic recoil detection analysis, if m_{2}/m_{1} <<1, all recoiling ions have similar velocities. It can be deduced from the previous equation the maximum scattering angle, θ^{'}_{max}, as Eq. 2 describes:

(2) $\theta_{max} = \arcsin \frac {m_2}{m_1}$

Using these parameters, absorber foils do not need to be incorporated into the instrument design. When using heavy ion beams and the parameters above, the geometry can be estimated as to allow for incident particle collision and scattering at an angle deflected away from the detector. This will prevent degradation of the detector from the more intense beam energies.

The differential elastic recoil cross-section σ_{ERD} is given by:

(3) $\sigma_{ERD} = \left ( \frac{Z_1 Z_2 e^2}{2E_1} \right ) ^2 \left ( \frac{m_1+m_2}{m_2} \right ) ^2 \cos^{-3} \phi$

where Z_{1} and Z_{2} are the atomic numbers of projectile and sample atoms, respectively. For m_{2}/m_{1} <<1 and with approximation m=2Z; Z being the atomic number of Z_{1} and Z_{2}. In Eq. 3 two essential consequences can be seen, first the sensitivity is roughly the same for all elements and second it has a Z_{1}^{4} dependence on the projector of the ion. This allows for the use of low energy beam currents in HI-ERDA preventing sample degradation and excessive heating of the specimen.

When using heavy ion beams, care must be taken for beam-induced damage in sample such as sputtering or amorphization. If only nuclear interaction is taken into account, it has been shown that the ratio of recoiling to displaced atoms is independent of Z_{1} and only weakly dependent on the projectile mass of the incident ion. With heavy ion bombardment, it has been shown that the sputter yield by the ion beam on the sample increases for nonmetallic samples and enhanced radiation damage in superconductors. In any case, the acceptance angle of the detector system should be as large as possible to minimize the radiation damage. However, it may reduce the depth profiling and elemental analysis due to the ion beam not being able to penetrate the sample.

This demand of a large acceptance angle, however, is in conflict with the requirement of optimum depth resolution dependency on the detection geometry. In the surface approximation and assuming constant energy loss the depth resolution δx can be written:

(4) $\delta x = \frac{\delta E_2}{E_2} S_{rel}^{-1}$

where S_{rel} is the relative energy loss factor defined by:

(5) $S_{rel} = \frac{\frac{d E_1}{dx}}{E_1} \frac{1}{\sin \alpha} + \frac{\frac{d E_2}{dx}}{E_2} \frac{1}{\sin \beta}$

here, α and β are the incidence angles of the beam and exit angle of the recoiling ion respectively, connected to the scattering angle ϕ by ϕ=α+β. It should be noticed here that the depth resolution depends on the relative energy resolution only, as well as the relative stopping power of incoming and outgoing ions. The detector resolution and energy broadening associated with the measuring geometry contribute to the energy spread, δE. The detector acceptance angle and the finite beam spot size define a scattering angle range δϕ causing a kinematic energy spread δE_{kin} according to Eq. 6:

(6) $\delta E_{kin} = 2 E_2 \tan\phi \ \delta\phi$

A detailed analysis of the different contributions to depth resolution shows that this kinematic effect is the predominant term near the surface, severely limiting the permitted detector acceptance angle, whereas energy straggling dominates the resolution at larger depth. For example, if one estimates δϕ for a scattering angle of 37.5° causing a kinematic energy shift comparable to typical detector energy resolutions of 1%, the angular spread δψ must be less than 0.4°. The angular spread can be maintained within this range by contributions from the beam spot size; however, the solid angle geometry of the detector is only 0.04 msr. Therefore, a detector system with large solid angle as well as high depth resolution may enable corrections for the kinematic energy shift.

In an elastic scattering event, the kinematics requires that the target atom is recoiled with significant energy. Eq. 7 models the recoil kinematical factor that occurs during the ion bombardment.

(7) $E \approx K E_0$

(8) $K_s = \left (\frac{\cos \theta \pm \sqrt{r^2 - \sin^2 \theta}}{(1+r)} \right )^2$

(9) $Kr = \frac{4r \, \cos^2 \phi}{(1+r)^2}$

(10) $r = \frac{M_1}{M_2}$

Eq. 7 gives a mathematical model of the collision event when the heavier ions in the beam strike the specimen. K_{s} is termed the kinematical factor for the scattered particle (Eq. 8) with a scattering angle of θ, and the recoiled particle (Eq. 9) with a recoil angle of Φ. The variable r is the ratio of mass of the incident nuclei to that of the mass of the target nuclei, (Eq. 10). To achieve this recoil of particles, the specimen needs to be very thin and the geometries need to be precisely optimized to obtain accurate recoil detection. Since ERD beam intensity can damage the specimen and there has been growing interest to invest in the development of low energy beams for reducing the damage of the specimen.

The cathode is divided into two insulated halves, where particle entrance position is derived from charges induced on the left, l, and right, r, halves of the cathode. Using the following equation, x-coordinates of particle positions, as they enter the detector, can be calculated from charges l and r:

(11) $x = \frac{l-r}{l+r}$

Furthermore, the y-coordinate is calculated from the following equation due to the position independence of the anode pulses:

(12) $y = \frac{l+r}{E_{tot}}$

For transformation of the (x, y) information into scattering angle ϕ a removable calibration mask in front of the entrance window is used. This mask allows correction for x and y distortions too. For notation detail, the cathode has an ion drift time on the order of a few milliseconds. To prevent ion saturation of the detector, a limit of 1 kHz must be applied to the number of particles entering the detector.

== Instrumentation ==
Elastic recoil detection analysis was originally developed for hydrogen detection or a light element (H, He, Li, C, O, Mg, K) profiling with an absorber foil in front of the energy detector for beam suppression. Using an absorber foil prevents the higher energy ion beam from striking the detector and causing degradation. Absorber foils increase the lifetime of the detector. More advanced techniques have been implemented to negate the use of absorber foils and the associated difficulties that arise through the use of it. In most cases, medium heavy ion beams, typically ^{36}Cl ions, have been used for ERDA so far with energies around 30 MeV. Depth resolution and element profiling of thin films has been greatly advanced using elastic recoil detection analysis.

=== Ion source and interactions ===
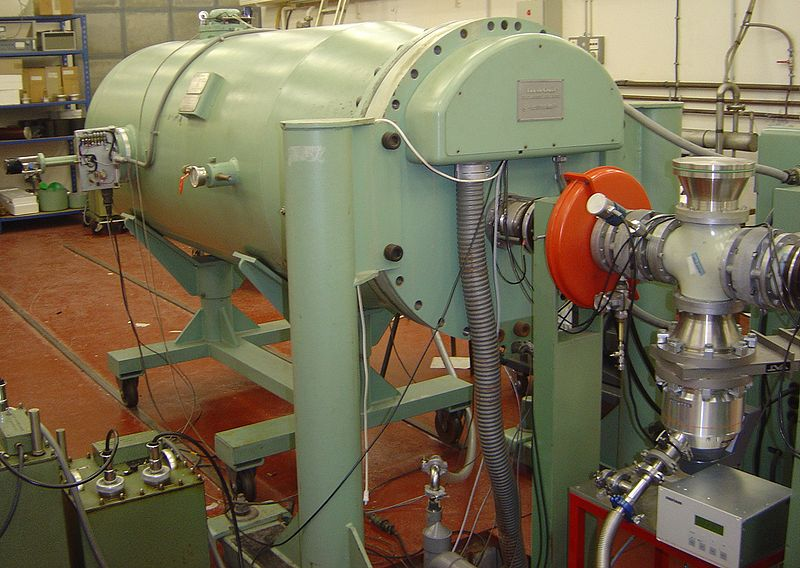
Van de Graaff generator coupled with a particle accelerator

Particle accelerators, such as a magnetron or cyclotron, implement electromagnetic fields to achieve acceleration of elements. Atoms must be electrically charged (ionized) before they can be accelerated. Ionization involves the removal of electrons from the target atoms. A magnetron can be used to produce hydrogen ions. Van de Graaff generators have also been integrated with particle accelerators for light ion beam generation.

For heavier ion production, for example, an electron cyclotron resonance (ECR) source can be used. At the National Superconducting Cyclotron Laboratory, neutral atoms have their electrons removed using an ECR ion source. ECR works by ionizing the vapor of a desired element such as chlorine and iodine. Further, utilizing this technique, metals (Au, Ag, etc.) can also be ionized using a small oven to achieve a vapor phase. The vapor is maintained within a magnetic field long enough for the atoms to be ionized by collisions with electrons. Microwaves are applied to the chamber as to keep the electrons in motion.

The vapor is introduced via injection directly into the "magnetic bottle" or the magnetic field. Circular coils provide the shape for the magnetic bottle. The coils are found at the top and bottom of the chamber with a hexapole magnet around the sides. A hexapole magnet consists of permanent magnets or superconducting coils. The plasma is contained within the magnetic trap that is formed from electric current flowing in solenoids located on the sides of the chamber. A radial magnetic field, exerted by the hexapole magnetic, is applied to the system that also confines the plasma. Acceleration of the electrons is achieved using resonance. For this to occur, the electrons must pass through a resonance zone. In this zone, their gyrofrequency or cyclotron frequency is equal to the frequency of the microwave injected into the plasma chamber. Cyclotron frequency is defined as the frequency of a charged particle moving perpendicular to the direction of a uniform magnetic field B. Since the motion is always circular, cyclotron frequency-ω in radians/second-can be described by the following equation:

(13) $\frac{|q|B}{m}$ = ω

where m is the mass of the particle, its charge is q, and the velocity is v. Ionization is a step-by-step process from collisions of the accelerated electrons with the desired vapor atoms. The gyrofrequency of an electron is calculated to be 1.76x107 Brad/second.

Now that the vapor of the desired has been ionized, they must be removed from the magnetic bottle. To do this, a high voltage is between the hexapoles applied to pull out the ions from the magnetic field. The extraction of the ions, from the chamber, is carried out using an electrode system through a hole in a positively biased plasma chamber. Once the ions have been extracted from the chamber, they are then sent to the cyclotron for acceleration. It is very important that the ion source used is optimal for the experiment being carried out. To perform an experiment in a practical amount of time, the ions provided from the accelerator complex should have the correct desired energy. The quality and stability of the ion beam needs to be considered carefully, due to the fact that only the ions with the correct flight trajectory can be injected in the cyclotron and accelerated to the desired energy.

During ERDA, the idea is to place an ion beam source at a grazing angle to the sample. In this set up, the angle is calculated as to allow the incident ions to scatter off of the sample so that there is no contact made with the detector. The physical basis that has given the method its name stems from the elastic scattering of incident ions on a sample surface and detecting the recoiling sample atoms while the incident ions backscatter at such an angle, that they do not reach the detector; this is typically in reflection geometry.

Another method for preventing incident ions from making contact with the detector is to use an absorber foil. During analysis of the elastically recoiled particles, an absorber foil with selected specific thickness can be used to "stop" the heavy recoil and beam ions from reaching the detector; reducing the background noise. Incorporating an absorber into the experimental set up can be the most difficult to achieve. The stopping of the beam using either direct or scattered methods can only be accomplished without also stopping the light impurity atoms, if it is heavier (beam ions) than the impurity atoms being analyzed. There are advantages when using absorber films:

1. The large beam Z_{1} gives rise to a large Rutherford cross section and because of the kinematics of heavy-on-light collisions that cross section is nearly independent of the target, if M_{1}>> M_{2} and M ~2Z; this helps in reducing the background.
2. The higher stopping power provides a good depth resolution of ~300 Angstroms, limited in fact by straggling in the absorber.

The major criterion for absorber foils used in ERDA is whether a recoiling impurity atom can be transmitted through the absorber, preferably a commercially available metal foil, while stopping heavy particles. Since the lighter atoms leave the absorber with smaller energies, the kinematic calculations do not provide much help. Favorable results have been obtained by using heavier ion beams of approximately 1 MeV/ nucleon. The best overall candidate is the ^{35}Cl ion beam; although, ^{79}Br would give better sensitivity by one order of magnitude compared to the ^{35}Cl ion beam. The mass resolution, of the detector at θ= 0°, of thin samples is ΔM/Δx ~ 0.3 amu/1000 Angstroms of the profile width. With thick samples, the mass resolution is feasible at θ≤30°. In thicker samples there is some degradation of mass resolution and slight loss of sensitivity. The detector solid angle has to be closed, but the thick sample can take more current without heating, which decreases sample degradation.

=== Detectors ===
Once the ion beam has ionized target sample atoms, the sample ions are recoiled toward the detector. The beam ions are scattered at an angle that does not permit them to reach the detector. The sample ions pass through an entrance window of the detector, and depending on the type of detector used, the signal is converted into a spectrum.

==== Silicon diode detector ====
In elastic recoil detection analysis, a silicon diode is the most common detector. This type of detector is commonly used, however, there are some major disadvantages when using this type of detector. For example, the energy resolution decreases significantly with a Si detector when detecting heavy recoiled ions. There is also a possibility of damage to the detector by radiation exposure. These detectors have a short functional lifetime (5–10 years) when doing heavy ion analysis. One of the main advantages of silicon detectors is their simplicity. However, they have to be used with a so-called "range foil" to range out the forward scattered heavy beam ions. Therefore, the simple range foil ERD has two major disadvantages: first, the loss of energy resolution due to the energy straggle and second, thickness inhomogeneity of the range foil, and the intrinsic indistinguishability of the signals for the various different recoiled target elements. Aside from the listed disadvantages, ERDA range foils with silicon detectors is still a powerful method and is relatively simple to work with.

==== Time of flight detector ====
Another method of detection for ERDA is time of flight (TOF)-ERD. This method does not present the same issues, as those for the silicon detector. However, the throughput of TOF detectors is limited; the detection is performed in a serial fashion (one ion in the detector at a time). The longer the TOF for ions, the better the time resolution (equivalent to energy resolution) will be. TOF spectrometers that have an incorporated solid state detector must be confined to small solid angles. When performing HI-ERDA, TOF detectors are often used and/or ∆E/E detectors-such as ionization chambers. These types of detectors usually implement small solid angles for higher depth resolution. Heavier ions have a longer flight time than the lighter ions. Detectors in modern time-of-flight instruments have improved sensitivity, temporal and spatial resolution, and lifetimes. Hi mass bipolar (high mass ion detection), Gen 2 Ultra Fast (twice as fast as traditional detectors), and High temperature (operated up to 150 °C) TOF are just a few of the commercially available detectors integrated with time-of-flight instruments. Linear and reflectron-TOF are the more common instruments used.

==== Ionization detector ====
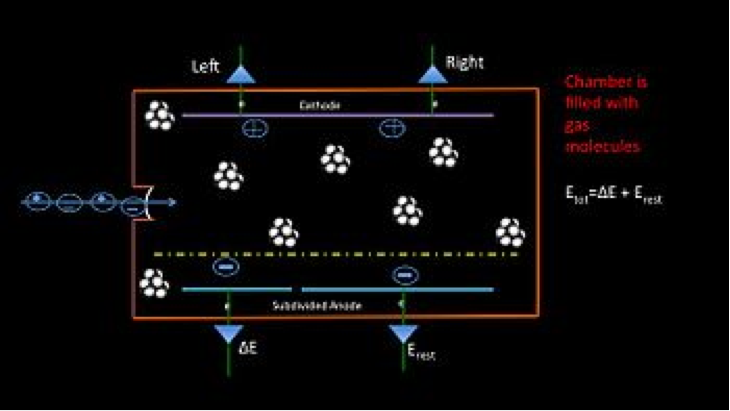
Gas ionization chamber, in which positive charges are migrating toward the cathode and the negatively charged ions are migrating toward the sub divided anode through a Frisch Grid.

A third type of detector is the gas ionization detector. The gas ionization detectors have some advantages over silicon detectors, for example, they are completely impervious to beam damage, since the gas can be replenished continuously. Nuclear experiments with large area ionization chambers increase the particle and position resolution have been used for many years and can easily be assimilated to any specific geometry. The limiting factor on energy resolution using this type of detector is the entrance window, which needs to be strong enough to withstand the atmospheric pressure of the gas, 20–90 mbar. Ultra-thin silicon nitride windows have been introduced, together with dramatic simplifications in the design, which have been demonstrated to be nearly as good as more complex designs for low energy ERD. These detectors have also been implemented in heavy-ion rutherford backscattering spectrometry.

The energy resolution obtained from this detector is better than a silicon detector when using ion beams heavier than helium ions. There are various designs of ionization detectors but a general schematic of the detector consists of a transversal field ionization chamber with a Frisch grid positioned between anode and cathode electrodes. The anode is subdivided into two plates separated by a specific distance. From the anode, signals ∆E(energy lost), E_{rest}(residual energy after loss), and E_{tot} (the total energy E_{tot}= ΔΕ+E_{rest}) as well as the atomic number Z can be deduced. For this specific design, the gas used was isobutane at pressures of 20–90 mbar with a flow rate that was electronically controlled. A polypropylene foil was used as the entrance window. The foil thickness homogeneity is of more importance for the detector energy resolution than the absolute thickness. If heavy ions are used and detected, the effect of energy loss straggling will be easily surpassed by the energy loss variation, which is a direct consequence of different foil thicknesses. The cathode electrode is divided in two insulated halves, thus information of particle entrance position is derived from charges induced at the right and left halves.

=== ERDA and energy detection of recoiled sample atoms ===
ERDA in transmission geometry, where only the energy of the recoiling sample atoms is measured, was extensively used for contamination analysis of target foils for nuclear physics experiments. This technique is excellent for discerning different contaminants of foils used in sensitive experiments, such as carbon contamination. Using ^{127}I ion beam, a profile of various elements can be obtained and the amount of contamination can be determined. High levels of carbon contamination could be associated with beam excursions on the support, such as a graphite support. This could be corrected by using a different support material. Using a Mo support, the carbon content could be reduced from 20 to 100 at.% to 1–2 at.% level of the oxygen contamination probably originating from residual gas components. For nuclear experiments, high carbon contamination would result in extremely high background and the experimental results would be skewed or less differentiable with the background. With ERDA and heavy ion projectiles, valuable information can be obtained on the light element content of thin foils even if only the energy of the recoils is measured.

=== ERDA and particle identification ===
Generally, the energy spectra of different recoil elements overlap due to finite sample thickness, therefore particle identification is necessary to separate the contributions of different elements. Common examples of analysis are thin films of TiN_{x}O_{y}-Cu and BaBiKO. TiN_{x}O_{y}-Cu films were developed at LMU Munich and are used as tandem solar absorbers. The copper coating and the glass substrate was also identified. Not only is ERDA is also coupled to Rutherford backscattering spectrometry, which is a similar process to ERDA. Using a solid angle of 7.5 mrs, recoils can be detected for this specific analysis of TiN_{x}O_{y}-Cu. It is important when designing an experiment to always consider the geometry of the system as to achieve recoil detection. In this geometry and with Cu being the heaviest component of the sample, according to eq. 2, scattered projectiles could not reach the detector. To prevent pileup of signals from these recoiled ions, a limit of 500 Hz needed to be set on the count rate of ΔΕ pulses. This corresponded to beam currents of lass than 20 particle pA.

Another example of thin film analysis is of BaBiKO. This type of film showed superconductivity at one of the highest-temperatures for oxide superconductors. Elemental analysis of this film was carried out using heavy ion-ERDA. These elemental constituents of the polymer film (Bi, K, Mg, O, along with carbon contamination) were detected using an ionization chamber. Other than potassium, the lighter elements are clearly separated in the matrix. From the matrix, there is evidence of a strong carbon contamination within the film. Some films showed a 1:1 ratio of K to carbon contamination. For this specific film analysis, the source for contamination was traced to an oil diffusion pump and replaced with an oil-free pumping system.

=== ERDA and position resolution ===
In the above examples, the main focus was identification of constituent particles found in thin films and depth resolution was of less significance. Depth resolution is important in applications when a profile of a sample's elemental composition, in different sample layers, has to be measured. This is a tool for materials characterization. Being able to quantify elemental concentration in sub-surface layers can provide information pertaining to chemical properties. High sensitivity, i.e. large detector solid angle, can be combined with high depth resolution only if the related kinematic energy shift is compensated.

== Physical processes of ERDA ==
The basic chemistry of forward recoil scattering process is considered to be charged particle interaction with matters. To understand forward recoil spectrometry, it is instructive to review the physics involved in elastic and inelastic collisions. In elastic collision, only kinetic energy is conserved in the scattering process, and there is no role of particle internal energy. Meanwhile, in case of inelastic collision, both kinetic energy and internal energy are participated in the scattering process. Physical concepts of two-body elastic scattering are the basis of several nuclear methods for elemental material characterization.

=== Fundamentals of recoil (backscattering) spectrometry ===
The Fundamental aspects in dealing with recoil spectroscopy involves electron back scattering process of matter such as thin films and solid materials. Energy loss of particles in target materials is evaluated by assuming that the target sample is laterally uniform and constituted by a mono isotopic element. This allows a simple relationship between that of penetration depth profile and elastic scattering yield.

=== Main assumptions in physical concepts of Back scattering spectrometry ===
- Elastic collision between two bodies is the energy transfer from a projectile to a target molecule. This process depends on the concept of kinematics and mass perceptibility.
- Probability of occurrence of collision provides information about scattering cross section.
- Average loss of energy of an atom moving through a dense medium gives idea on stopping cross section and capability of depth perception.
- Statistical fluctuations caused by the energy loss of an atom while moving through a dense medium. This process leads to the concept of energy straggling and a limitation to the ultimate depth and mass resolution in back scattering spectroscopy.

Physical concepts that are highly important in interpretation of forward recoil spectrum are depth profile, energy straggling, and multiple scattering. These concepts are described in detail in the following sections:

=== Depth profile and resolution analysis ===
A key parameter that characterizes recoil spectrometry is the depth resolution. This parameter is defined as the ability of an analytical technique to measure a variation in atomic distribution as a function of depth in a sample layer.

In terms of low energy forward recoil spectrometry, hydrogen and deuterium depth profiling can be expressed in the following mathematical notation:

$\Delta x = \frac{\Delta E_{total}}{(dE_{det}/dx)}$where δE_{det} defines as the energy width of a channel in a multichannel analyzer, and dE_{det}/dx is the effective stopping power of the recoiled particles.

Consider an Incoming and outgoing ion beams that are calculated as a function of collisional depth, by considering two trajectories are in a plane perpendicular to target surface, and incoming and outgoing paths are the shortest possible ones for a given collision depth and given scattering and recoil angles .

Impinging ions reach the surface, making an angle θ_{1}, with the inward-pointing normal to the surface. After collision their velocity makes an angle θ_{1}, with the outward surface normal; and the atom initially at rest recoils, making an angle θ_{1}, with this normal. Detection is possible at one of these angles as such that the particle crosses the target surface. Paths of particles are related to collisional depth x, measured along a normal to the surface.

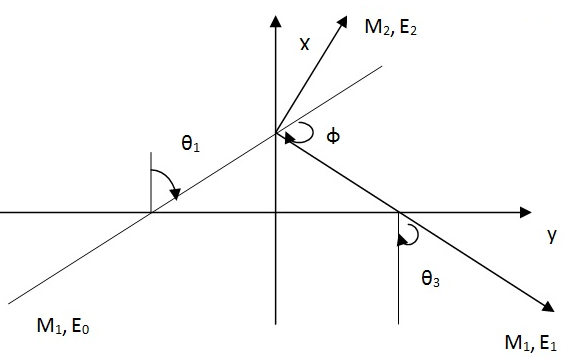
Planar representation of scattered projectile path of an ion beam. This figure is plane representation of a scattered projectile on the target surface, when both incoming and outgoing paths are perpendicular to target surface.

For the impinging ion, length of the incoming path L_{1} is given by: $L_{1} = \frac{x}{\cos\theta_{1}}$

The outgoing path length L_{2} of the scattered projectile is: $L_{2} = \frac{x}{\cos\theta_{2}}$

And finally the outgoing path L_{3} of the recoil is: $L_{3} = \frac{x}{\cos\theta_{3}}$

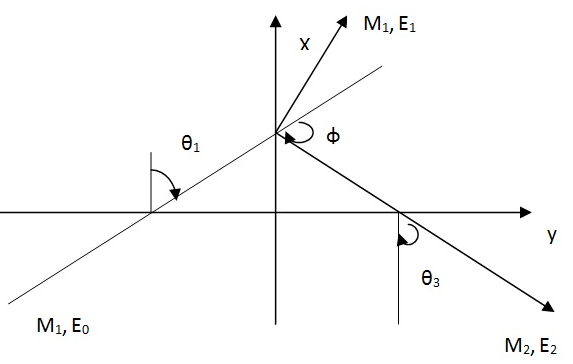
Planar representation of recoiled path of an ion beam. This figure is plane representation of a recoiled ion path on the target surface, when both incoming and outgoing paths are perpendicular to target surface.

In this simple case a collisional plane is perpendicular to the target surface, the scattering angle of the impinging ion is θ = π-θ_{1}-θ_{2} and the recoil angle is φ = π-θ_{1}-θ_{3}.

The target angle with the collisional plane is taken as α, and path is augmented by a factor of 1/cos α.

For the purpose of converting outgoing particle in to collision depth, geometrical factors are chosen.

For recoil, R(φ, α) is defined as:

$\sin L_3 = R(\varphi, \alpha)L_1$

$R(\phi,\alpha) = \frac{\cos\theta_{1}\cos\alpha}{\sin\phi \sqrt{\cos^{2}\alpha-\cos^{2}\theta_{1}} - \cos\theta_{1}\cos\phi}$

For forward scattering of the projectile, R(φ,α) is given by:

$L_2 = R(\theta, \alpha) L_1$

$R(\theta, \alpha) = \frac{\cos \theta_1 \cos \alpha}{\sin \theta \sqrt{\cos^2 \alpha - \cos^2 \theta_1} - \cos \theta_1 \cos \theta}$

Paths of scattered particles are considered to be L_{1} for incident beam, L_{2} is for scattered particle, and L_{3} is for recoiled atoms.

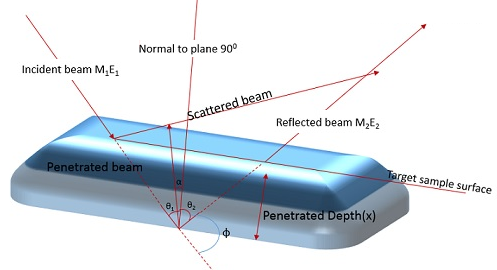
Typical geometrical configuration of recoil spectrometry

=== Energy depth relationship ===
The energy E_{0}(x) of the incident particle at a depth (x) compared to its initial energy E_{0} where scattering occurs is given by the following equations.

$$E_{0}(x) = E_{0}- \int_{0}^{(x/\cos\theta1)}S(E)\,dL_{1}-Equation(1)$$

Similarly, energy expression for the scattered particle is:$E_{1}(x) = KE_{0}(x)- \int_{0}^{(x/\cos\theta2)}S(E)\,dL_{2}-Equation(2)$

and for the recoil atom is:

$E_{2}(x) = K'E_{0}(x)- \int_{0}^{(x/\cos\theta3)}S_r(E)\,dL_{3}-Equation(3)$

The energy loss per unit path is usually defined as stopping power and it is represented by: $S = \frac{dE}{dx}$

Specifically, stopping power S(E) is known as a function of the energy E of an ion.

Starting point for the energy loss calculations is illustrated by the expression:

$$\Delta E
= \int_{0}^{\Delta x} \frac{dE}{dx}\,dx$$

By applying the above equation and energy conservation Illustrates expressions in 3 cases:

$$L_{1}
= \int_{E_0(x)}^{E_0} \frac{dE}{S(E)}$$

$$L_{2}
= \int_{E_1(x)}^{E_{01}(x)} \frac{dE}{S(E)}$$

$$L_{3}
= \int_{E_2(x)}^{E_{02}(x)} \frac{dE}{S_r(E)}$$

Here, $E_{01}(x) = KE_0(x)$ and $E_{02}(x) = K'E_0(x)$ ; $S(E)$ and $S_r(E)$ are the stopping powers for the projectile and recoil in the target material. Finally, the stopping cross-section is defined by $\varepsilon (E) = S(E)/N$, where ε is the stopping cross-section factor.

To obtain the energy path scale, we need to evaluate the energy variation δE_{2} of the outgoing beam of energy E_{2} from the target surface for an increment δx of collisional depth, while E_{0} remains fixed. This causes changes in path lengths L_{1} and L_{3}. The variation of the path around the collision point x is related to the corresponding variation in energy before scattering:

$\delta L_1 = \delta \frac{E_0(x)}{S[E_0(x)]}$

Moreover, particles with slight energy differences after scattering from a depth x undergo slight energy losses on their outgoing path. Then the change δL_{3} of the path length L_{3} can be written as:

$\delta L_3 = \delta \frac{K' E_0(x)}{S_r(K' E_0(x))} + \delta \frac{E_2}{S_r E_2}$

δL_{1} is the path variations due to energy variation just after the collision and δL_{3} is the path variation because of variation of energy loss along the outward path. The above equations can be solved assuming δx = 0 for the derivative $dL_1/dE_2$ and $L_3=R(\varphi \alpha)L_1$:

$\frac{dL_1}{dE_2} = \frac{1}{\frac{S_r(E_2)}{S_r[K'E_0(x)]}{ R(\phi, \alpha) S_r[K'E_0(x)] + K'S[E_0(x)]}}$

In elastic spectrometry, the term $[S]$ is called as energy loss factor:

$[S] = \frac{K'S(E(x))}{\cos \theta_1} + S_r(K'E(x)) 2 \cos \theta_2$

Finally, the stopping cross section is defined by $\varepsilon(E) \equiv S(E)/N$, where N is the atomic density of the target material.

The stopping cross-section factor is given by:

$[\varepsilon] = \frac{K'' \varepsilon(E(x))}{\cos \theta_1} + \frac{\varepsilon_r(K''E(x))}{\cos \theta_3}$

=== Depth resolution ===
An important parameter that characterizes recoil spectrometer is depth resolution. It is defined as the ability of an analytical technique to detect a variation in atomic distribution as a function of depth. The capability to separate in energy in the recoil system arising from small depth intervals. The expression for depth resolution is given as:

$\delta R_x = \frac{\delta E_T}{\left[ \frac{S_r(E_2)}{S_r(K'E_0(x))} \right] \left[ R(\phi, \alpha) S_r(K'E_0(x)) + K'S(E_0(x)) \right]}$

Here, δE_{T} is the total energy resolution of the system, and the expression in the denominator is the sum of the path integrals of initial, scattered and recoil ion beams.

=== Practical importance of depth resolution ===
The concept of depth resolution represents the ability of Recoil spectrometry to separate the energies of scattered particles that occurred at slightly different depths δR_{x} is interpreted as an absolute limit for determining the concentration profile. From this point of view, a concentration profile separated by a depth interval of the order of magnitude of δR_{x} would be undistinguishable in the spectrum, and obviously it is impossible to gain accuracy better than δR_{x} to assign depth profile. In particular the fact that the signals corresponding to features of the concentration profile separated by less than δR_{x} strongly overlap in the spectrum.

A finite final depth resolution resulting from both theoretical and experimental limitations has deviation from exact result when consider an ideal situation. Final resolution is not coincide with theoretical evaluation such as the classical depth resolution δR_{x} precisely because it results from three terms that escape from theoretical estimations:

- Incertitude due to approximations of energy spread among molecules.
- Inconsistency in data on stopping powers and cross section values.
- Statistical fluctuations of recoil yield (counting noise).

=== Influence of energy broadening on a recoil spectrum ===
Straggling is energy loss of particle in a dense medium is statistical in nature due to a large number of individual collisions between the particle and sample. Thus the evolution of an initially mono energetic and mono directional beam leads to dispersion of energy and direction. The resulting statistical energy distribution or deviation from initial energy is called energy straggling. Energy straggling data are plotted as a function of depth in the material.

The energy distribution of straggling is divided into three domains depending on the ratio of ΔE i.e., ΔE /E where ΔE is the mean energy loss and E is the average energy of the particle along the trajectory.

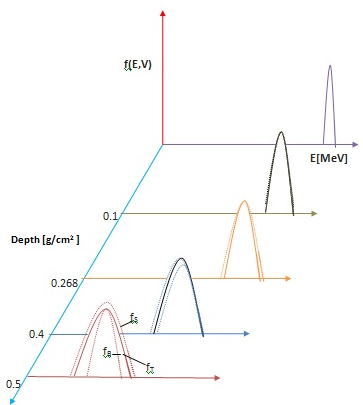
Propagation of the energy straggling distribution through an Al foil for protons of 19.6 MeV with different distribution functions f_{B}:Bohr,f_{S}:Symon,f_{T}:Tschalar

1. Low fraction of energy loss: for very thin films with small path lengths, where ΔE/E ≤ 0.01, Landau and Vavilov derived that infrequent single collisions with large energy transfers contributes certain amount of loss in energy.

2. Medium fraction of energy loss: for regions where 0.01< ΔE/E ≤ 0.2. Bohr's model based on electronic interactions is useful for estimating energy straggling for this case, and this model includes the amount of energy straggling in terms of the areal density of electrons traversed by the beam.

The standard deviation Ω^{2}B of the energy distribution is$\Omega^2 B = 4\pi ((Z_1 e^2)^2 NZ_2 \Delta x$, where NZ_{2}Δx is the number of electrons per unit area over the path length increment Δx.

3. Large fraction of energy loss: for fractional energy loss in the region of 0.2 < ΔE/E ≤ 0.8, the energy dependence of stopping power causes the energy loss distribution to differ from Bohr's straggling function. This case can not be described by the Bohr theory, and has been treated using alternative approaches.

An expression of energy for straggling was proposed by Symon in the region of 0.2 < ΔE/E ≤ 0.5.

Tschalar et al. derived a straggling function $\Omega^2 T = (S^2[E(x)] \sigma^2(E) dE)/(S^3(E))$, where σ^{2}(E) represents energy straggling per unit length (or) variance of energy loss distribution per unit length for particles of energy E, and E(x) is the mean energy at depth x. The Tschalar's expression is valid for nearly symmetrical energy loss spectra.

=== Mass resolution ===
In a similar way mass resolution is a parameter that characterizes the capability of recoil spectrometry to separate two signals arising from two neighboring elements in the target. The difference in the energy δE_{2} of recoil atoms after collision when two types of atoms differ in their masses by a quantity δM_{2} is:

$\frac{E_2}{\delta M_2} = E_0 \frac{dK'}{dM_2}$

$\frac{\delta E_2}{\delta M_2} = \frac{4 E_0 M_1 (M_1 - M_2) \cos^2 \phi}{(M_1 + M_2)^2}$

Mass resolution δMR (≡ δE_{2}/ δM_{2}).

A main limitation of using low beam energies is the reduced mass resolution. The energy separation of different masses is, in fact, directly proportional to the incident energy. The mass resolution is limited by the relative E and velocity v.

Expression for mass resolution is: ΔM = √(∂M/∂E.∆E)^{2} + √(∂M/∂v.∆v)^{2}

ΔM = M(√((∆E)/E)^{2}+√(2.∆v/v)^{2})

Here, E is the energy, M is the mass, v is the velocity of the particle beam, and ΔM is the reduced mass difference.

=== Multiple scattering scheme in forward recoil spectrometry ===
When an ion beam penetrating in to matter, ions undergo successive scattering events and deviates from original direction. The beam of ions in initial stage are well collimated(single direction), but after passing through a thickness of Δx in a random medium their direction of light propagation certainly differs from normal direction . As a result, both angular and lateral deviations from the initial direction can occur. These two parameters are discussed below. Hence, path length will be increased than expected causing fluctuations in ion beam. This process is called multiple scattering, and it is statistical in nature due to the large number of collisions.

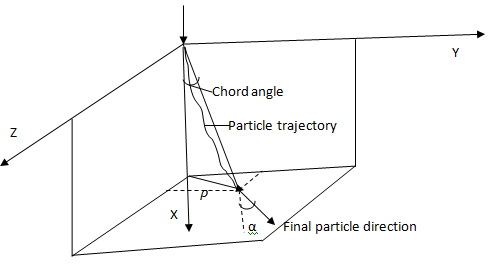
Multiple scattering scheme where the ion beam is directed in the x direction. Lateral displacement perpendicular to the beam direction is ρ(y,z), and α is the total angular deviation after the penetrated depth x

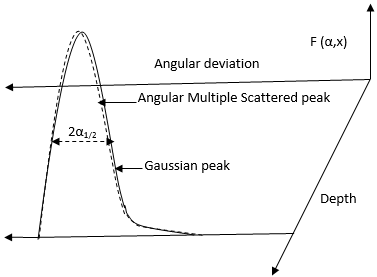
Propagation of multiple scattering angular distribution through matter. The half-width of the angular distribution is α_{1/2}. There is a considerable difference between the shape of Gaussian peak (ideal condition) and angularly deviated peak.

=== Theory and experiment of multiple scattering phenomena ===
In the study of multiple scattering phenomenon angular distribution of a beam is important quantity for consideration. The lateral distribution is closely related to the angular one but secondary to it, since lateral displacement is a consequence of angular divergence. Lateral distribution represents the beam profile in the matter. both lateral and angular Multiple scattering distributions are interdependent.

The analysis of multiple scattering was started by Walther Bothe and Gregor Wentzel in the early 1920s using well-known approximation of small angles. The physics of energy straggling and multiple scattering was developed by Williams in 1929–1945. Williams devised a theory, which consists of fitting the multiple scattering distribution as a Gaussian-like portion due to small scattering angles and the single collision tail due to the large angles. William, E.J., studied beta particle straggling, Multiple scattering of fast electrons and alpha particles, and cloud curvature tracks due to scattering to explain Multiple scattering in different scenario and he proposed a mean projection deflection occurrence due to scattering. His theory later extended to multiple scattering of alpha particles. Goudsmit and Saunderson provided a more complete treatment of multiple scattering, including large angles. For large angles Goudsmit considered series of Legendre polynomials which are numerically evaluated for distribution of scattering. The angular distribution from Coulomb scattering has been studied in by Molière in the 1940s and then by Marion and coworkers, who tabulated energy loss of charged particles in matter, multiple scattering of charged particles, range straggling of protons, deuterons and alpha particles, and equilibrium charge states of ions in solids and energies of elastically scattered particles. Scott presents a complete review of basic theory, mathematical methods, as well as results and applications.

A comparative development of multiple scattering at small angles was presented by Meyer, based on a classical calculation of single cross section. Sigmund and Winterbon extended the Meyer's calculation to a more general case. Marwick and Sigmund carried out development on lateral spreading by multiple scattering, which resulted in a simple scaling relation with the angular distribution.

== Applications ==
ERDA has applications in the areas of polymer science, semiconductor materials, electronics, and thin film characterization. ERDA is widely used in polymer science. This is because polymers are hydrogen-rich materials which can be easily studied by LI-ERDA. One can examine surface properties of polymers, polymer blends and evolution of polymer composition induced by irradiation. HI-ERDA can also be used in the field of new materials processed for microelectronics and opto-electronic applications. Moreover, elemental analysis and depth profiling in thin film can also be performed using ERDA.

ERDA is also used to characterize hydrogen transport near interfaces induced by corrosion and wear.

Characterizing how polymer molecules behave at interfaces between incompatible polymers and at interfaces with inorganic solid substances can help us understand and improve the performance of polymers in applications. For example, the adhesion of two polymers may depend on the interactions occurring at the interface between polymer segments. LI-ERDA can be a method for investigating these aspects of polymer science quantitatively.

Electronic devices are usually composed of sequential thin layers made up of oxides, nitrides, silicides, metals, polymers, or doped semiconductor–based media coated on a single-crystalline substrate (Si, Ge or GaAs). These structures can be studied by HI-ERDA. This technique has one major advantage over other methods. The profile of impurities can be found in a one-shot measurement at a constant incident energy. Moreover, this technique offers an opportunity to study the density profiles of hydrogen, carbon and oxygen in various materials, as well as the absolute hydrogen, carbon and oxygen content.
