= Ion beam analysis =

Analytical techniques involving ion beams

Ion beam analysis (IBA) is an important family of modern analytical techniques involving the use of MeV ion beams to probe the composition and obtain elemental depth profiles in the near-surface layer of solids. IBA is not restricted to MeV energy ranges. It can be operated at low energy (<Kev) using techniques such as FIB, and Secondary ion mass spectroscopy, as well as at higher energies (>GeV) using instruments like the LHC. All IBA methods are highly sensitive and allow the detection of elements in the sub-monolayer range. The depth resolution is typically in the range of a few nanometers to a few ten nanometers. Atomic depth resolution can be achieved, but requires special equipment. The analyzed depth ranges from a few ten nanometers to a few ten micrometers. IBA methods are always quantitative with an accuracy of a few percent. Channeling allows to determine the depth profile of damage in single crystals.

- RBS: Rutherford backscattering is sensitive to heavy elements in a light matrix. This technique is used for determining elemental composition and depth profiling of materials.
- EBS: Elastic (non-Rutherford) backscattering spectrometry can be sensitive even to light elements in a heavy matrix. The term EBS is used when the incident particle is going so fast that it exceeds the "Coulomb barrier" of the target nucleus, which therefore cannot be treated by Rutherford's approximation of a point charge. In this case Schrödinger's equation should be solved to obtain the scattering cross-section (see http://www-nds.iaea.org/sigmacalc/).
- ERD: Elastic recoil detection is sensitive to light elements in a heavy matrix
- PIXE: Particle-induced X-ray emission gives the trace and minor elemental composition
- NRA: Nuclear reaction analysis is sensitive to particular isotopes
- Channelling: The fast ion beam can be aligned accurately with major axes of single crystals; then the strings of atoms "shadow" each other and the backscattering yield falls dramatically. Any atoms off their lattice sites will give visible extra scattering. Thus damage to the crystal is visible, and point defects (interstitials) can even be distinguished from dislocations.
- IBIL: Ion beam induced luminescence occurs when an energetic beam of ions strike a target, excite the native atoms, and visible light is emitted as a result of outer-shell transitions.

The quantitative evaluation of IBA methods requires the use of specialized simulation and data analysis software. SIMNRA and DataFurnace are popular programs for the analysis of RBS, ERD and NRA, while GUPIX is popular for PIXE. A review of IBA software was followed by an intercomparison of several codes dedicated to RBS, ERD and NRA, organized by the International Atomic Energy Agency.

IBA is an area of active research. The last major Nuclear Microbeam conference in Debrecen (Hungary) was published in NIMB 267(12–13).

== Overview ==
Ion beam analysis works on the basis that ion-atom interactions are produced by the introduction of ions to the sample being tested. Major interactions result in the emission of products that enable information regarding the number, type, distribution and structural arrangement of atoms to be collected. To use these interactions to determine sample composition a technique must be selected along with irradiation conditions and the detection system that will best isolate the radiation of interest providing the desired sensitivity and detection limits. The basic layout of an ion beam apparatus is an accelerator which produces an ion beam that is feed through an evacuated beam-transport tube to a beam handling device. This device isolates the ion species and charge of interest which then are transported through an evacuated beam-transport tube into the target chamber. This chamber is where the refined ion beam will come into contact with the sample and thus the resulting interactions can be observed. The configuration of the ion beam apparatus can be changed and made more complex with the incorporation of additional components. The techniques for ion beam analysis are designed for specific purposes. Some techniques and ion sources are shown in table 1. Detector types and arrangements for ion beam techniques are shown in table 2.

Table 1: Techniques and Ion Sources
	Ion Source	Current	Ion Beams	Technique
Low Energy	Radio frequency	1 mA	H, He, N, O	LEIS
Low Energy	Duoplasmatron	10 mA	H, He, N, O	
Low Energy	Colutron			
Low Energy	Penning	5 mA	C, N, Ne, Kr	
Low Energy	CaeDsium sputter		Most Solid	SIMS
Low Energy	Freeman	10 mA	Most Solid	
Low Energy	Electron impact			
Low Energy	LMIS		Ga, In, Au, Bi	
High Energy	Positive ions			
High Energy	Radio-frequency	1 mA	H, He, N, O	RBS, PIXE, NRA
High Energy	Duoplamatron	10 mA	H, He, N, O	RBS, PIXE, NRA
High Energy	Negative ions			
High Energy	Duoplasmatron (off-axis extraction)	100 mA	H, O	RBS, PIXE, NRA
High Energy	Penning	2 mA	H, ^{2}H	RBS, PIXE, NRA
High Energy	Sputter-source		Most	RBS, PIXE, NRA
High Energy	RF with charge exchange	100 mA	H, He, N, O	RBS, PIXE, NRA

Table 2: Detector Types and Arrangements for Ion Beam Techniques
	Product	Detector	Configuration	Vacuum
LEIS	Scattered Ions	Channeltron	Vacuum, movable advantageous Energy measurement requires Electrostatic/magnetic analyser	10 nPa
SIMS	Secondary Ions	Channeltron	Vacuum, fixed geometry Low mass resolution with ESA, QMA High mass resolution with Sector Field Analyser	< 1mPa
SIPS	Optical Photons	Spectrophotometer	External to chamber, Fixed geometry, High wavelength resolution.	< 1mPa
PIXE	X-Rays	Si (Li) IG	Vacuum or external. Filters Thin Window. Liquid N cooling	< 1mPa
RBS	Ions	Surf.barrier	Vacuum, movable geometry Small and simple arrangement	
RBS-C	Ions	Surf.barrier		< 100 mPa
ERA	Ions	Surf.barrier	Glancing angle geometry for improved depth resolution	
NRA	Ions	Surf.barrier		
PIGME	Gamma-rays	Ge (Li) NaI	External with window, cryostat High Resolution, Low efficiency Poor Resolution, high efficiency	< 100 mPa
NRA	Neutrons	BF_{3} Li glass Scintillator	External, low efficiency Detection only Broad resolution by unfolding	

== Applications ==
Ion beam analysis has found use in a number of variable applications, ranging from biomedical uses to studying ancient artifacts. The popularity of this technique stems from the sensitive data that can be collected without significant distortion to the system on which it is studying. The unparalleled success found in using ion beam analysis has been virtually unchallenged over the past thirty years until very recently with new developing technologies. Even then, the use of ion beam analysis has not faded, and more applications are being found that take advantage of its superior detection capabilities. In an era where older technologies can become obsolete at an instant, ion beam analysis has remained a mainstay and only appears to be growing as researchers are finding greater use for the technique.

=== Biomedical elemental analysis ===
Gold nanoparticles have been recently used as a basis for a count of atomic species, especially with studying the content of cancer cells. Ion beam analysis is a great way to count the amount of atomic species per cell. Scientists have found an effective way to make accurate quantitative data available by using ion beam analysis in conjunction with elastic backscattering spectrometry (EBS). The researchers of a gold nanoparticle study were able to find much greater success using ion beam analysis in comparison to other analytical techniques, such as PIXE or XRF. This success is due to the fact that the EBS signal can directly measure depth information using ion beam analysis, whereas this cannot be done with the other two methods. The unique properties of ion beam analysis make great use in a new line of cancer therapy.

=== Cultural heritage studies ===
Ion beam analysis also has a unique application in the use of studying archaeological artifacts, also known as archaeometry. For the past three decades, this has been the much preferred method to study artifacts while preserving their content. What many have found useful in using this technique is its offering of excellent analytical performance and non-invasive character. More specifically, this technique offers unparalleled performance in terms of sensitivity and accuracy. Recently however, there have been competing sources for archaeometry purposes using X-ray based methods such as XRF. Nonetheless, the most preferred and accurate source is ion beam analysis, which is still unmatched in its analysis of light elements and chemical 3D imaging applications (i.e. artwork and archaeological artifacts).

=== Forensic analysis ===
A third application of ion beam analysis is in forensic studies, particularly with gunshot residue characterization. Current characterization is done based on heavy metals found in bullets, however, manufacturing changes are slowly making these analyses obsolete. The introduction of techniques such as ion beam analysis are believed to alleviate this issue. Researchers are currently studying the use of ion beam analysis in conjunction with a scanning electron microscope and an Energy Dispersive X-ray spectrometer (SEM-EDS). The hope is that this setup will detect the composition of new and old chemicals that older analyses could not efficiently detect in the past. The greater amount of analytical signal used and more sensitive lighting found in ion beam analysis gives great promise to the field of forensic science.

=== Lithium battery development ===
The spatially resolved detection of light elements, for example lithium, remains challenging for most techniques based on the electronic shell of the target atoms such as XRF or SEM-EDS. For lithium and lithium-ion batteries, the quantification of the lithium stoichiometry and its spatial distribution are important to understand the mechanisms behind dis-/charging and aging. Through ion beam focussing and a combination of methods, ion beam analysis offers the unique possibility for measuring the local state of charge (SoC) on the μm-scale.

== Iterative IBA ==
Ion beam-based analytical techniques represent a powerful set of tools for non-destructive, standard-less, depth-resolved and highly accurate elemental composition analysis in the depth regime from several nm up to few μm. By changing type of incident ion, the geometry of experiment, particle energy, or by acquiring different products originating from ion-solid interaction, complementary information can be extracted. However, analysis is often challenged either in terms of mass resolution—when several comparably heavy elements are present in the sample—or in terms of sensitivity—when light species are present in heavy matrices. Hence, a combination of two or more ion beam-based techniques can overcome the limitations of each individual method and provide complementary information about the sample.

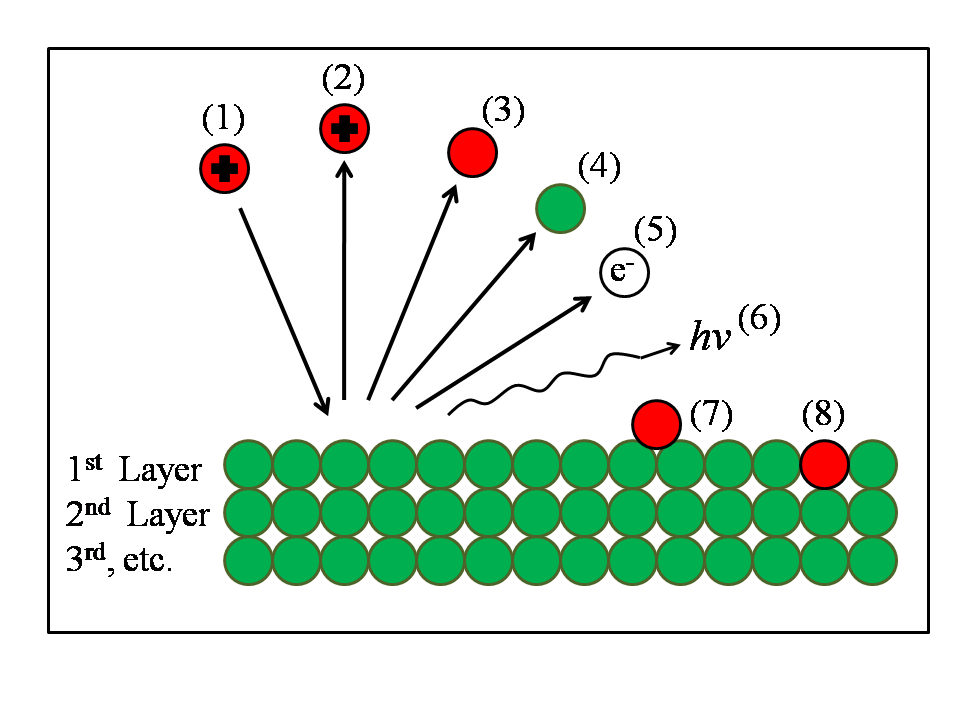
Overview of various ion-surface interactions. (1)-incoming ion; (2)-scattering; (3)-neutralization and scattering; (4)-sputtering or recoiling; (5)-electron emission; (6)-photon emission; (7)-adsorption; (8)-displacement, e.g. from sputtering event

An iterative and self-consistent analysis also enhances the accuracy of the information that can be obtained from each independent measurement.

== Software and simulation ==
Dating back to the 1960s the data collected via ion beam analysis has been analyzed through a multitude of computer simulation programs. Researchers who frequently use ion beam analysis in conjunction with their work require that this software be accurate and appropriate for describing the analytical process they are observing. Applications of these software programs range from data analysis to theoretical simulations and modeling based on assumptions about the atomic data, mathematics and physics properties that detail the process in question. As the purpose and implementation of ion beam analysis has changed over the years, so has the software and codes used to model it. Such changes are detailed through the five classes by which the updated software are categorized.

=== Class-A ===
Includes all programs developed in the late 1960s and early 1970s. This class of software solved specific problems in the data; niy did not provide the full potential to analyze a spectrum of a full general case. The prominent pioneering program was IBA, developed by Ziegler and Baglin in 1971. At the time, the computational models only tackled the analysis associated with the back-scattering techniques of ion beam analysis and performed calculation based on a slab analysis. A variety of other programs arose during this time, such as RBSFIT, though due to the lack of in-depth knowledge on ion beam analysis, it became increasingly hard to develop programs that accurate.

=== Class-B ===
A new wave of programs sought to solve this accuracy problem in this next class of software. Developed during the 1980s, programs like SQEAKIE and BEAM EXPERT, afforded an opportunity to solve the complete general case by employing codes to perform direct analysis. This direct approach unfolds the produced spectrum with no assumptions made about the sample. Instead it calculates through separated spectrum signals and solves a set of linear equations for each layer. Problems still arise, though, and adjustments made to reduce noise in the measurements and room for uncertainty.

=== Class-C ===
In a trip back to square one, this third class of programs, created in the 1990s, take a few principles from Class A in accounting for the general case, however, now through the use of indirect methods. RUMP and SENRAS, for example, use an assumed model of the sample and simulate a comparative theoretical spectra, which afforded such properties as fine structure retention and uncertainty calculations. In addition to the improvement in software analysis tools came the ability to analyze other techniques aside from back-scattering; i.e. ERDA and NRA.

=== Class-D ===
Exiting the Class C era and into the early 2000s, software and simulation programs for ion beam analysis were tackling a variety of data collecting techniques and data analysis problems. Following along with the world's technological advancements, adjustments were made to enhance the programs into a state more generalized codes, spectrum evaluation, and structural determination. Programs produced like SIMNRA now account for the more complex interactions with the beam and sample; also providing a known database of scattering data.

=== Class-E ===
This most recently developed class, having similar characteristics to the previous, makes use of primary principles in the Monte Carlo computational techniques. This class applies molecular dynamic calculations that are able to analyze both low and high energy physical interactions taking place in the ion beam analysis. A key and popular feature that accompanies such techniques is the possibility for the computations to be incorporated in real time with the ion beam analysis experiment itself.
