= Ion beam =

Beam of charged atoms (ions)

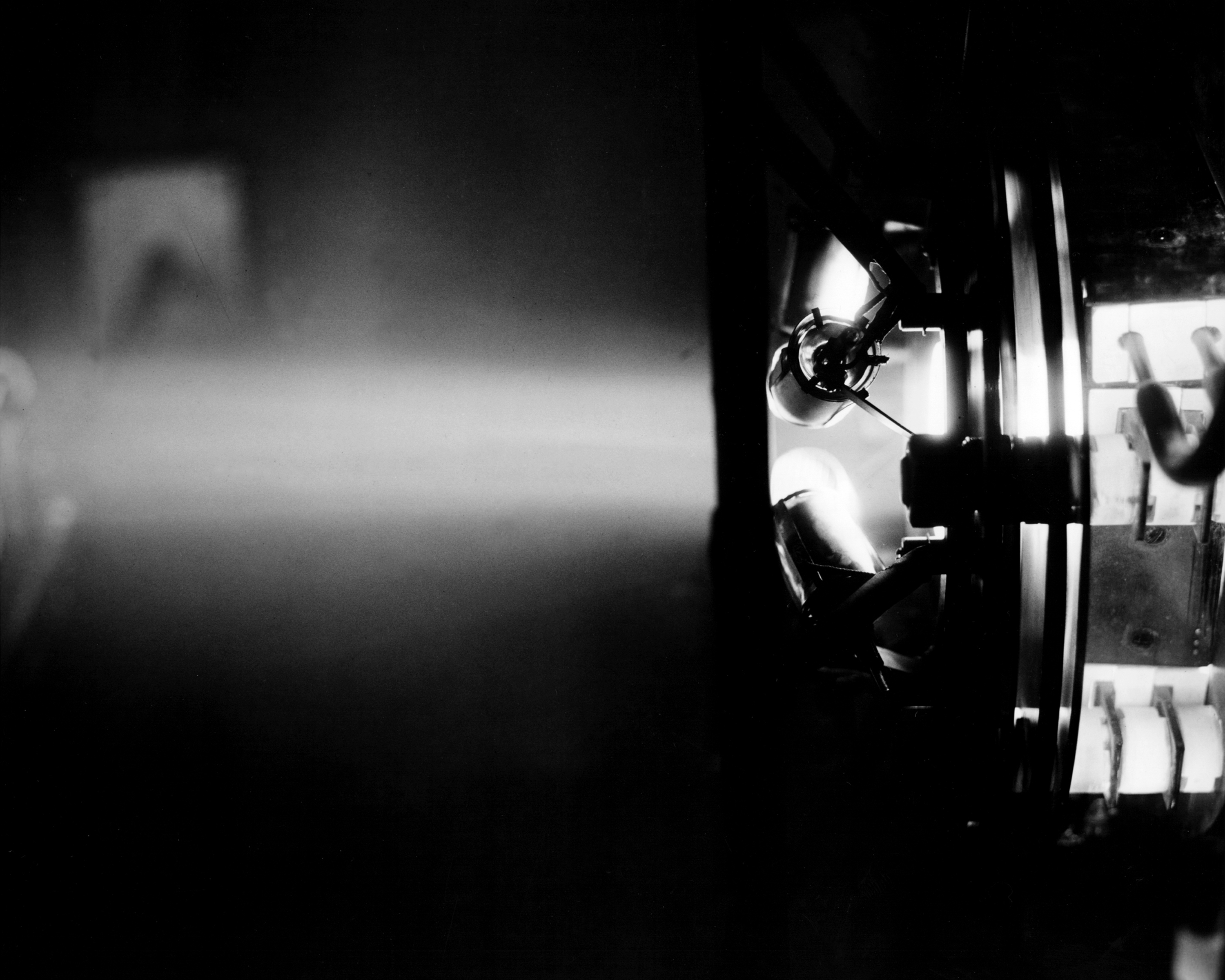
A small ion beam rocket being tested by NASA.

An ion beam is a beam of ions, a type of charged particle beam. Ion beams have many uses in electronics manufacturing (principally ion implantation) and other industries. There are many ion beam sources, some derived from the mercury vapor thrusters developed by NASA in the 1960s. The most widely used ion beams are of singly-charged ions.

== Units ==
Ion current density is typically measured in mA/cm^{2}, and ion energy in electronvolts (eV). The use of eV is convenient for converting between voltage and energy, especially when dealing with singly charged ion beams.

== Broad-beam ion sources ==
Most commercial applications use two popular types of ion source, gridded and gridless, which differ in current and power characteristics and the ability to control ion trajectories. In both cases electrons are needed to generate an ion beam. The most common types of electron emitter are hot filament and hollow cathode.

=== Gridded ion source ===
In a gridded ion source, DC or RF discharge are used to generate ions, which are then accelerated and decimated using grids and apertures. Here, the DC discharge current or the RF discharge power are used to control the beam current.

The ion current density $j$ that can be accelerated using a gridded ion source is limited by the space charge effect, which is described by Child's law:
$$j \approx \frac{4\epsilon_0}{9} \sqrt{\frac{2e}{m}} \frac{(\Delta V)^{\frac{3}{2}}}{d^2},$$
where $\Delta V$ is the voltage between the grids, $d$ is the distance between the grids, and $m$ is the ion mass.

The grids are spaced as closely as possible to increase the current density, typically $d\sim 1\ \mathrm{mm}$. The ions used have a significant impact on the maximum ion beam current, since $j \propto m^{-{1}/{2}}$. All else being equal, the maximum ion beam current with krypton is only 69% of the maximum ion current of an argon beam; with xenon the ratio drops to 55%.

=== Gridless ion sources ===
In a gridless ion source, ions are generated by a flow of electrons, without grids. The most common gridless ion source is the end-Hall ion source, with which the discharge current and the gas flow are used to control the beam current.

== Applications ==
=== Material modification and analysis ===
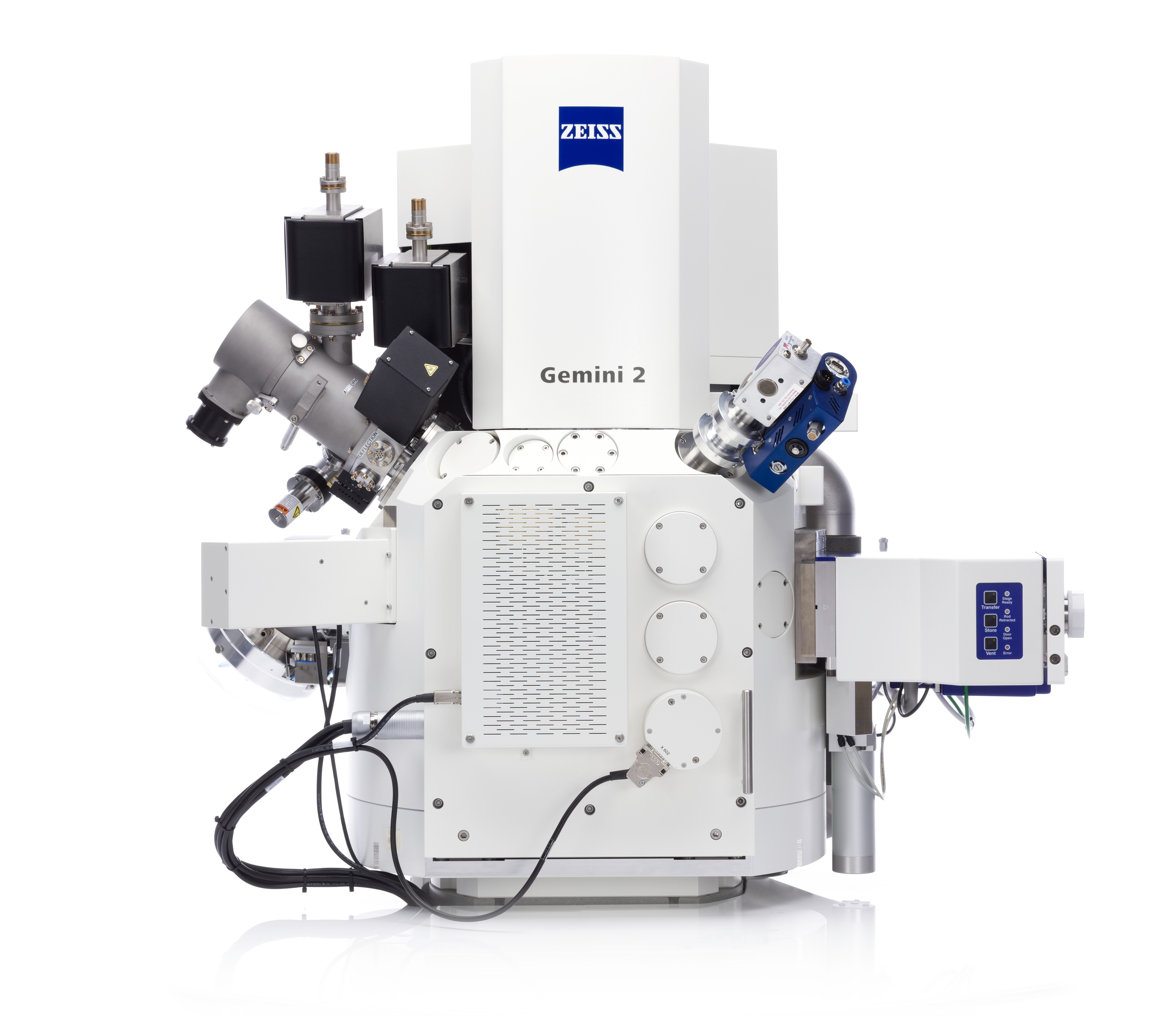
Carl Zeiss Crossbeam 550 – combines a field emission scanning electron microscope (FE-SEM) with a focused ion beam (FIB).

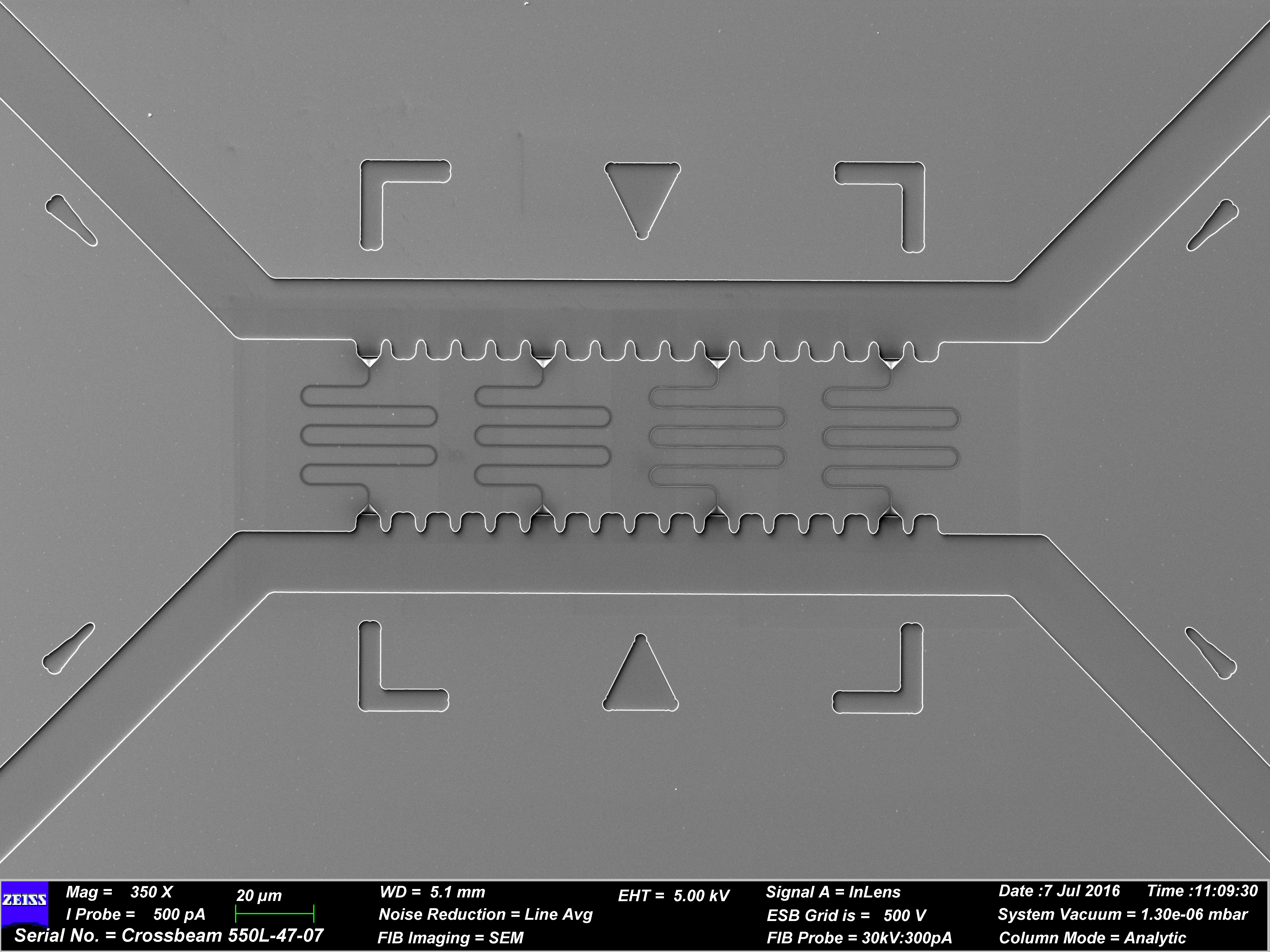
Nanofluidics channels fabricated with a Zeiss Crossbeam 550 L, in a silicon master stamp

Ion beams can be used for material modification (e.g. by sputtering or ion beam etching) and for ion beam analysis.

Ion beam application, etching, or sputtering, is a technique conceptually similar to sandblasting, but using individual atoms in an ion beam to ablate a target. Reactive ion etching is an important extension that uses chemical reactivity to enhance the physical sputtering effect.

In a typical use in semiconductor manufacturing, a mask can selectively expose a layer of photoresist on a substrate made of a semiconductor material, such as a silicon dioxide or gallium arsenide wafer. The wafer is developed, and for a positive photoresist, the exposed portions are removed in a chemical process. The result is a pattern left on the surface areas of the wafer that had been masked from exposure. The wafer is then placed in a vacuum chamber, and exposed to the ion beam. The impact of the ions erodes the target, abrading away the areas not covered by the photoresist.

Focused ion beam (FIB) instruments have numerous applications for characterization of thin-film devices. Using a focused, high-brightness ion beam in a scanned raster pattern, material is removed (sputtered) in precise rectilinear patterns revealing a two-dimensional, or stratigraphic profile of a solid material. The most common application is to verify the integrity of the gate oxide layer in a CMOS transistor. A single excavation site exposes a cross section for analysis using a scanning electron microscope. Dual excavations on either side of a thin lamella bridge are utilized for preparing transmission electron microscope samples.

Another common use of FIB instruments is for design verification and/or failure analysis of semiconductor devices. Design verification combines selective material removal with gas-assisted material deposition of conductive, dielectric, or insulating materials. Engineering prototype devices may be modified using the ion beam in combination with gas-assisted material deposition in order to rewire an integrated circuit's conductive pathways. The techniques are effectively used to verify the correlation between the CAD design and the actual functional prototype circuit, thereby avoiding the creation of a new mask for the purpose of testing design changes.

Ions beams are also used for analysis purposes in Materials science. For example sputtering techniques can be used for surface analysis or depth profiling by performing secondary ion mass spectrometry. It is also possible to gain information from the spectroscopy of transmitted or backscattered primary ions, e.g. depth profiles can be obtained from Rutherford backscattering (RBS) spectra. In difference to secondary ion spectroscopy scattering based techniques like RBS are often less destructive to the sample.

=== Biology ===
In radiobiology a broad or focused ion beam is used to study mechanisms of inter- and intra- cellular communication, signal transduction and DNA damage and repair.

=== Medicine ===
Ion beams are also used in particle therapy, most often in the treatment of cancer.

=== Space applications ===
Ion beams produced by ion and plasma thrusters on board a spacecraft can be used to transmit a force to a nearby object (e.g. another spacecraft, an asteroid, etc.) that is irradiated by the beam. This innovative propulsion technique named Ion Beam Shepherd has been shown to be effective in the area of active space debris removal as well as asteroid deflection.

=== High-energy ion beams ===
High-energy ion beams produced by particle accelerators are used in atomic physics, nuclear physics and particle physics.

=== As weapon ===
Ion beams can theoretically be used to make a weapon, but this has not been demonstrated. Electron beam weapons were tested by the U.S. Navy in the early 20th century, but the hose instability effect prevents them from being accurate at a distance of over approximately 30 inches.

== See also ==
- Ion source
- Ion thruster
- Ion wind
