= Ion-beam shepherd =

Method of changing an object's orbit

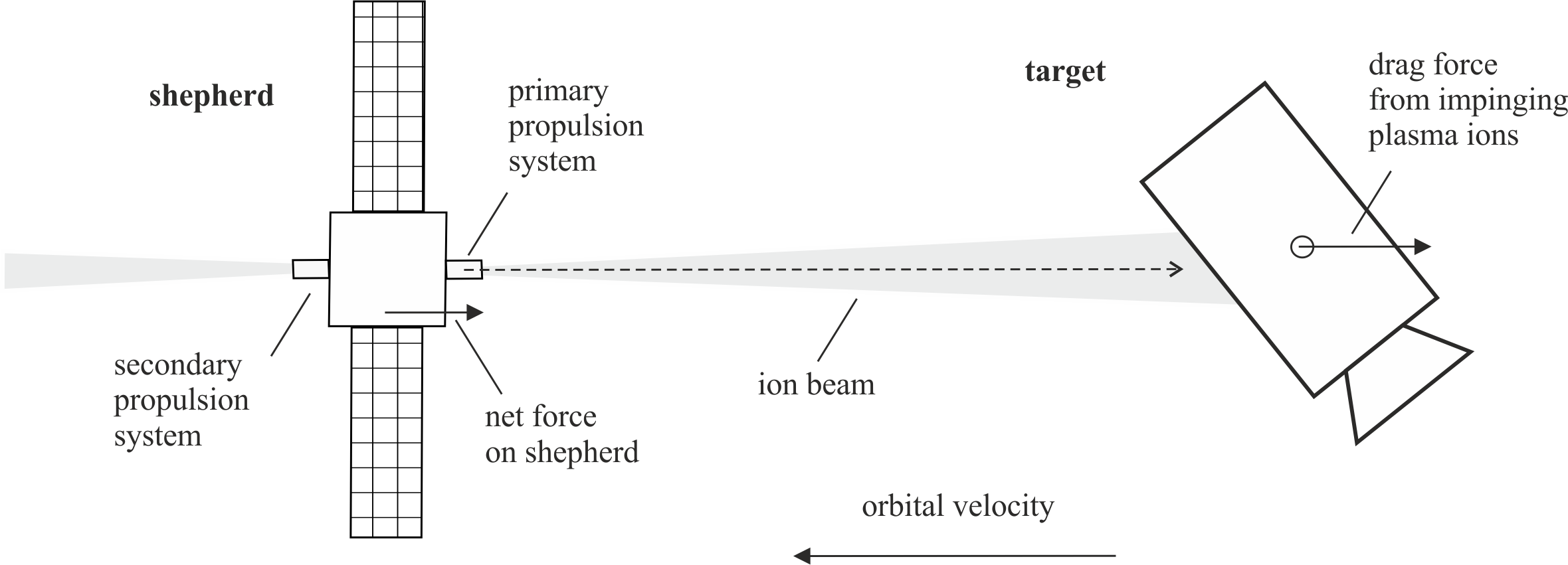
Ion-beam shepherd (IBS) deorbiting a space debris

An ion-beam shepherd (IBS) is a concept in which the orbit and/or attitude of a spacecraft or a generic orbiting body is modified by having a beam of quasi-neutral plasma impinging against its surface to create a force and/or a torque on the target. Ion and plasma thrusters commonly used to propel spacecraft can be employed to produce a collimated plasma/ion beam and point it towards the body. The fact that the beam can be generated on a "shepherd" spacecraft placed in proximity of the target without physical attachment with the latter provides an interesting solution for space applications such as space debris removal, asteroid deflection and space transportation in general. The Technical University of Madrid (UPM) is exploring this concept by developing analytical and numerical control models in collaboration with the Advanced Concepts Team of the European Space Agency. The concept has also been proposed independently by JAXA and CNES.

== How it works ==
The force and torque transmitted to the target originate from the momentum carried by the plasma ions (typically xenon) which are accelerated to a few tens of kilometers per second by an ion or plasma thruster. The ions that reach the target surface lose their energy following nuclear collision in the substrate of the target material. In order to keep a constant distance between the target and the shepherd spacecraft the latter must carry a secondary propulsion system (e.g. another ion or plasma thruster) compensating for the reaction force created by the targeted ion beam.

== Applications ==
The concept has been suggested as a possible solution for active space debris removal, as well as for accurate deflection of Earth threatening asteroids. Further in the future the concept could play an important role in areas such as space mobility, transportation, assembly of large orbital infrastructures and small asteroid capturing in Earth orbit.

== Control ==
Beam divergence angles of ion and plasma thrusters, typically greater than 10 degrees make it necessary to have the shepherd flying not more than a few target diameters away if efficient beam overlap is to be reached. Proximity formation flying guidance and control as well as collision avoidance are among the most critical technological challenges of the concept.
