= Crystallography =

Scientific study of crystal structures

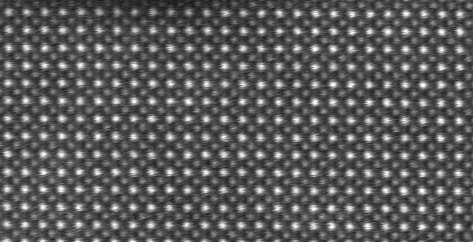
A crystalline solid: atomic resolution image of strontium titanate. Brighter spots are columns of strontium atoms and darker ones are titanium-oxygen columns.

Octahedral and tetrahedral interstitial sites in a face centered cubic structure

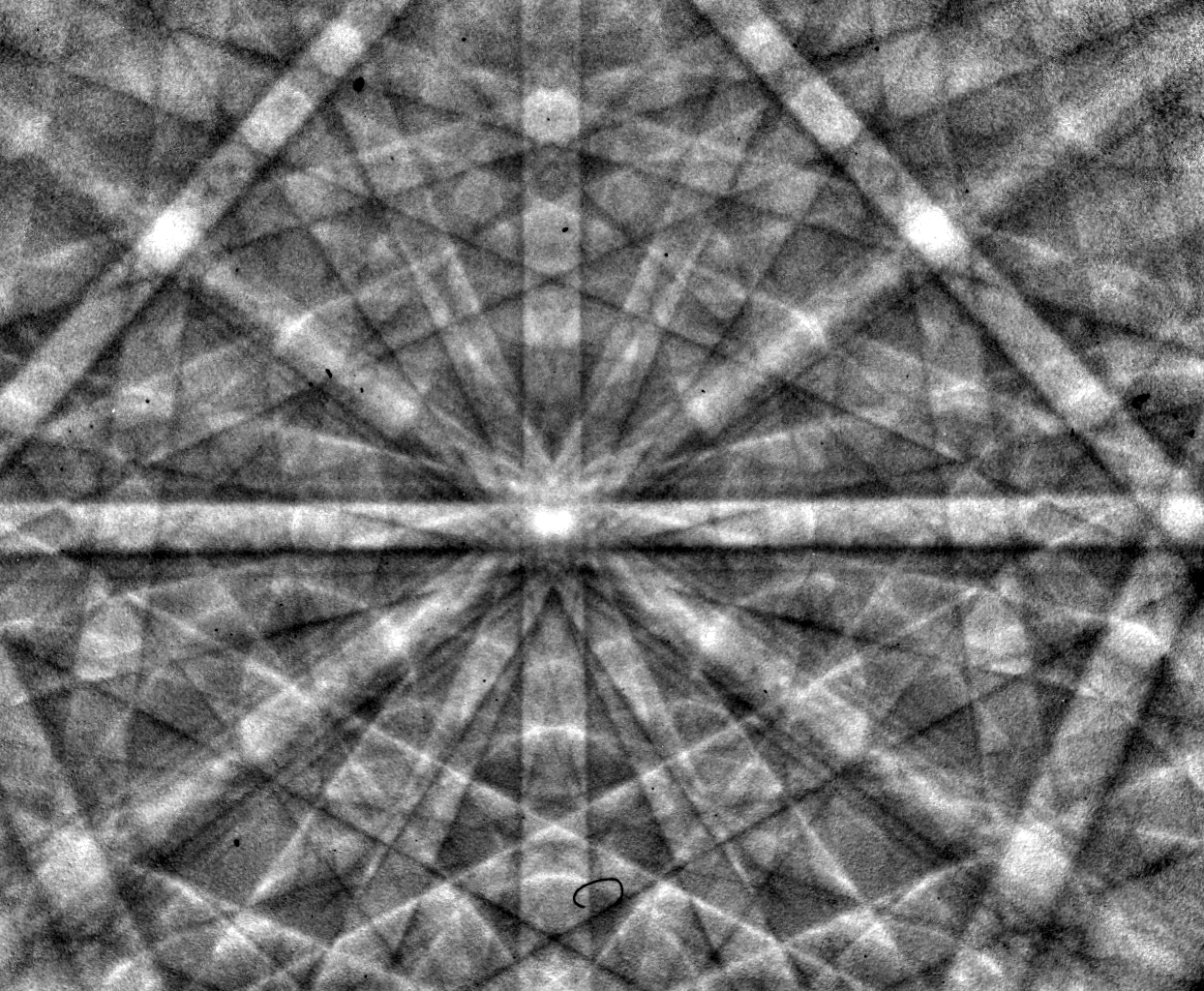
Kikuchi lines in an electron backscatter diffraction pattern of monocrystalline silicon, taken at 20 kV with a field-emission electron source

Crystallography is the branch of science devoted to the study of molecular and crystalline structure and properties. The word crystallography is derived from the Ancient Greek word κρύσταλλος (krústallos; "clear ice, rock-crystal"), and γράφειν (gráphein; "to write"). In July 2012, the United Nations recognised the importance of the science of crystallography by proclaiming 2014 the International Year of Crystallography.

Crystallography is a broad topic, and many of its subareas, such as X-ray crystallography, are themselves important scientific topics. Crystallography ranges from the fundamentals of crystal structure to the mathematics of crystal geometry, including those that are not periodic or quasicrystals. At the atomic scale it can involve the use of X-ray diffraction to produce experimental data that the tools of X-ray crystallography can convert into detailed positions of atoms, and sometimes electron density. At larger scales it includes experimental tools such as orientational imaging to examine the relative orientations at the grain boundary in materials. Crystallography plays a key role in many areas of biology, chemistry, and physics, as well as in emerging developments in these fields.

== History and timeline ==
Before the 20th century, the study of crystals was based on physical measurements of their geometry using a goniometer. This involved measuring the angles of crystal faces relative to each other and to theoretical reference axes (crystallographic axes), and establishing the symmetry of the crystal in question. The position in 3D space of each crystal face is plotted on a stereographic net such as a Wulff net or Lambert net. The pole to each face is plotted on the net. Each point is labelled with its Miller index. The final plot allows the symmetry of the crystal to be established.

The discovery of X-rays and electrons in the last decade of the 19th century enabled the determination of crystal structures on the atomic scale, which brought about the modern era of crystallography. The first X-ray diffraction experiment was conducted in 1912 by Max von Laue, while electron diffraction was first realized in 1927 in the Davisson–Germer experiment and parallel work by George Paget Thomson and Alexander Reid. These developed into the two main branches of crystallography, X-ray crystallography and electron diffraction. The quality and throughput of solving crystal structures greatly improved in the second half of the 20th century, with the developments of customized instruments and phasing algorithms. Nowadays, crystallography is an interdisciplinary field, supporting theoretical and experimental discoveries in various domains. Modern-day scientific instruments for crystallography vary from laboratory-sized equipment, such as diffractometers and electron microscopes, to dedicated large facilities, such as photoinjectors, synchrotron light sources and free-electron lasers.

== Methodology ==
Crystallographic methods depend mainly on analysis of the diffraction patterns of a sample targeted by a beam of some type. X-rays are most commonly used; other beams used include electrons or neutrons. Crystallographers often explicitly state the type of beam used, as in the terms X-ray diffraction, neutron diffraction and electron diffraction. These three types of radiation interact with the specimen in different ways.

- X-rays interact with the spatial distribution of electrons in the sample.
- Neutrons are scattered by the atomic nuclei through the strong nuclear forces, but in addition the magnetic moment of neutrons is non-zero, so they are also scattered by magnetic fields. When neutrons are scattered from hydrogen-containing materials, they produce diffraction patterns with high noise levels, which can sometimes be resolved by substituting deuterium for hydrogen.
- Electrons are charged particles and therefore interact with the total charge distribution of both the atomic nuclei and the electrons of the sample.

It is hard to focus x-rays or neutrons, but since electrons are charged they can be focused and are used in electron microscopes to produce magnified images. There are many ways that transmission electron microscopy and related techniques such as scanning transmission electron microscopy, high-resolution electron microscopy can be used to obtain images with in many cases atomic resolution from which crystallographic information can be obtained. There are also other methods such as low-energy electron diffraction, low-energy electron microscopy and reflection high-energy electron diffraction which can be used to obtain crystallographic information about surfaces.

== Applications in various areas ==
=== Materials science ===
Crystallography is used by materials scientists to characterize different materials. In large single crystals, the effects of the crystalline arrangement of atoms is often easy to see macroscopically because the natural shapes of crystals reflect the atomic structure. In addition, physical properties are often controlled by crystallographic defects, which requires an understanding of crystal space groups, point groups, and the processes that control how defects can change. Most materials do not occur as a single crystal, but are poly-crystalline in nature (they exist as an aggregate of small crystals with different orientations). As such, powder diffraction techniques, which take diffraction patterns of samples with a large number of crystals, play an important role in structural determination.

Other physical properties are also linked to crystallography. For example, the minerals in clay form small, flat, platelike structures. Clay can be easily deformed because the platelike particles can slip along each other in the plane of the plates, yet remain strongly connected in the direction perpendicular to the plates. Such mechanisms can be studied by crystallographic texture measurements. Crystallographic studies help elucidate the relationship between a material's structure and its properties, aiding in developing new materials with tailored characteristics. This understanding is crucial in various fields, including metallurgy, geology, and materials science. Advancements in crystallographic techniques, such as electron diffraction and X-ray crystallography, continue to expand our understanding of material behavior at the atomic level.

In another example, iron transforms from a body-centered cubic (bcc) structure called ferrite to a face-centered cubic (fcc) structure called austenite when it is heated. The fcc structure is a close-packed structure unlike the bcc structure; thus the volume of the iron decreases when this transformation occurs.

Crystallography is useful in phase identification. When manufacturing or using a material, it is generally desirable to know what compounds and what phases are present in the material, as their composition, structure and proportions will influence the material's properties. Each phase has a characteristic arrangement of atoms. X-ray or neutron diffraction can be used to identify which structures are present in the material, and thus which compounds are present. Crystallography covers the enumeration of the symmetry patterns which can be formed by atoms in a crystal and for this reason is related to group theory.

=== Biology ===
X-ray crystallography is the primary method for determining the molecular conformations of biological macromolecules, particularly protein and nucleic acids such as DNA and RNA. The first crystal structure of a macromolecule was solved in 1958, a three-dimensional model of the myoglobin molecule obtained by X-ray analysis. Neutron crystallography is often used to help refine structures obtained by X-ray methods or to solve a specific bond; the methods are often viewed as complementary, as X-rays are sensitive to electron positions and scatter most strongly off heavy atoms, while neutrons are sensitive to nucleus positions and scatter strongly even off many light isotopes, including hydrogen and deuterium. Electron diffraction has been used to determine some protein structures, most notably membrane proteins and viral capsids.

Macromolecular structures determined through X-ray crystallography (and other techniques) are housed in the Protein Data Bank (PDB)–a freely accessible repository for the structures of proteins and other biological macromolecules. There are many molecular graphics codes available for visualising these structures.

== Notation ==
- Coordinates in square brackets such as [100] denote a direction vector (in real space).
- Coordinates in angle brackets or chevrons such as <100> denote a family of directions which are related by symmetry operations. In the cubic crystal system for example, <100> would mean [100], [010], [001] or the negative of any of those directions.
- Miller indices in parentheses such as (100) denote a plane of the crystal structure, and regular repetitions of that plane with a particular spacing. In the cubic system, the normal to the (hkl) plane is the direction [hkl], but in lower-symmetry cases, the normal to (hkl) is not parallel to [hkl].
- Indices in curly brackets or braces such as {100} denote a family of planes and their normals. In cubic materials the symmetry makes them equivalent, just as the way angle brackets denote a family of directions. In non-cubic materials, <hkl> is not necessarily perpendicular to {hkl}.

== Reference literature ==
The International Tables for Crystallography is an eight-book series that outlines the standard notations for formatting, describing and testing crystals. The series contains books that covers analysis methods and the mathematical procedures for determining organic structure through x-ray crystallography, electron diffraction, and neutron diffraction. The International tables are focused on procedures, techniques and descriptions and do not list the physical properties of individual crystals themselves. Each book is about 1000 pages and the titles of the books are:

Vol A - Space Group Symmetry,
Vol A1 - Symmetry Relations Between Space Groups,
Vol B - Reciprocal Space,
Vol C - Mathematical, Physical, and Chemical Tables,
Vol D - Physical Properties of Crystals,
Vol E - Subperiodic Groups,
Vol F - Crystallography of Biological Macromolecules, and
Vol G - Definition and Exchange of Crystallographic Data.

== Notable scientists ==
- William Astbury
- William Barlow
- C. Arnold Beevers
- John Desmond Bernal
- William Henry Bragg
- William Lawrence Bragg
- Auguste Bravais
- Glenn H. Brown
- Martin Julian Buerger
- Sir Gordon Cox
- Francis Crick
- D. W. J. Cruickshank
- Pierre Curie
- Peter Debye
- Johann Deisenhofer
- Boris Delone
- Gautam R. Desiraju
- Eleanor Dodson
- Jack Dunitz
- David Eisenberg
- Paul Peter Ewald
- Evgraf Stepanovich Fedorov
- Rosalind Franklin
- Georges Friedel
- Jenny Glusker
- Paul Heinrich von Groth
- Herbert A. Hauptman
- René Just Haüy
- Wayne Hendrickson
- Carl Hermann
- Johann Friedrich Christian Hessel
- Dorothy Crowfoot Hodgkin
- Judith Howard
- Robert Huber
- Louise Johnson
- Isabella Karle
- Jerome Karle
- Olga Kennard
- Aaron Klug
- Max von Laue
- Otto Lehmann
- Michael Levitt
- Henry Lipson
- Kathleen Lonsdale
- Barbara Low
- Ernest-François Mallard
- Charles-Victor Mauguin
- William Hallowes Miller
- Friedrich Mohs
- Paul Niggli
- Louis Pasteur
- Arthur Lindo Patterson
- Max Perutz
- Friedrich Reinitzer
- Hugo Rietveld
- Jean-Baptiste L. Romé de l'Isle
- Michael Rossmann
- Paul Scherrer
- Arthur Moritz Schönflies
- Dan Shechtman
- George M. Sheldrick
- Tej P. Singh
- Nicolas Steno
- Constance Tipper
- Daniel Vorländer
- Christian Samuel Weiss
- Don Craig Wiley
- Michael Woolfson
- Ralph Walter Graystone Wyckoff
- Ada Yonath

== See also ==
- Atomic packing factor
- Crystal structure
- Crystallographer
- Crystallographic database
- Crystallographic point group
- Crystallographic group
- Dana classification system
- Electron crystallography
- Electron diffraction
- Fractional coordinates
- Low-energy electron diffraction
- Materials science
- Neutron crystallography
- Neutron diffraction at OPAL
- Neutron diffraction at the ILL
- NMR crystallography
- Point group
- Precession electron diffraction
- Quasicrystal
- Reflection high-energy electron diffraction
- Space group
- Symmetric group
- Timeline of crystallography
- Transmission electron microscopy
- X-ray crystallography
