= Overlayer =

Layer of adatoms adsorbed onto a surface

An overlayer is a layer of adatoms adsorbed onto a surface, for instance onto the surface of a single crystal.

== On single crystals ==
Adsorbed species on single crystal surfaces are frequently found to exhibit long-range ordering; that is to say that the adsorbed species form a well-defined overlayer structure. Each particular structure may only exist over a limited coverage range of the adsorbate, and in some adsorbate/substrate systems a whole progression of adsorbate structure are formed as the surface coverage is gradually increased.

The periodicity of the overlayer (which often is larger than that of the substrate unit cell) can be determined by low-energy electron diffraction (LEED), because there will be additional diffraction beams associated with the overlayer.

== Types ==
There are two types of overlayers: commensurate and incommensurate. In the former the substrate-adsorbate interaction tends to dominate over any lateral adsorbate-adsorbate interaction, while in the latter the adsorbate-adsorbate interactions are of similar magnitude to those between adsorbate and substrate.

== Notation ==
An overlayer on a substrate can be notated in either Wood's notation or matrix notation.

=== Wood's notation ===
Wood's notation takes the form

$$\text{M}(hk\ell) - \left( \tfrac{|\textbf{a}_0|}{|\textbf{a}_s|} \times \tfrac{|\textbf{b}_0|}{|\textbf{b}_s|} \right) - \text{R}\alpha^\circ - \text{A}$$

where M is the chemical symbol of the substrate, A is the chemical symbol of the overlayer, $(hk\ell)$ are the Miller indices of the surface plane, R and $\alpha$ correspond to the rotational difference between the substrate and overlayer vectors, and the vector magnitudes shown are those of the substrate ($s$ subscripts) and of the overlayer ($0$ subscripts). This notation can only describe commensurate overlayers however, while matrix notation can describe both.

=== Matrix notation ===
Matrix notation differs from Wood's notation in the second term, which is replaced by the $G$ matrix that describes the overlayer primitive vectors in terms of the substrate primitive vectors:

$$\begin{pmatrix} \textbf{a}_0\\ \textbf{b}_0 \end{pmatrix}=
G
\begin{pmatrix} \textbf{a}_s\\ \textbf{b}_s \end{pmatrix}$$
, where
$$G=\begin{pmatrix}
G_{11} & G_{12}\\ G_{21}& G_{22}\\
\end{pmatrix}$$

and so hence matrix notation has the form

$$\text{M}(hk\ell) - G - \text{R}\alpha^\circ - \text{A}$$

== See also ==
- Surface reconstruction
- Superstructure
- LEED#Superstructures
