= Superstructure (condensed matter) =

In solid state physics, a superstructure is some additional structure that is superimposed on a higher symmetry crystalline structure.

In crystallography and group theory, a superstructure refers to a crystal structure that can be derived from another basic crystal structure under certain conditions. The concept of a superstructure is related to but not the same as the concept of a superlattice. However, a superlattice is a distinct concept. A superlattice is derived from the addition of nodes to a lattice resulting in a crystal structure with extended periodicity and a larger unit cell relative to the original lattice. The two terms are often incorrectly used interchangeably.

A typical and important example is ferromagnetic ordering.

In a wider sense, the term "superstructure" is applied to polymers and proteins to describe ordering on a length scale larger than that of monomeric segments.

== In crystals ==
In a crystal, a superstructure manifests itself through additional reflections in diffraction patterns, e.g., in low energy electron diffraction (LEED) or X-ray diffraction experiments. Often a set of weak diffraction spots appears between the stronger spots belonging to what is referred to as the substructure. In some cases a phase transition occurs, e.g., at higher temperatures, where the superstructure disappears and the material reverts to the simpler substructure. Not all compounds exhibit a superstructure.

The superspots in diffraction patterns represent a modulation of the substructure that causes the inherent translation symmetry of the (substructure) lattice to be violated slightly or the size of the repeat motif of the structure to be increased. One could speak of symmetry breaking of the translation symmetry of the lattice, although rotational symmetry may be lost simultaneously.

=== Commensurate cases ===
If the superspots are located at simple fractions of the vectors of the reciprocal lattice of the substructure, e.g., at q=(½,0,0), the resulting broken symmetry is a multiple of the unit cell along that axis. Such a modulation is called a commensurate superstructure.

=== Incommensurate cases ===
In some materials, superspots will occur at positions that do not represent a simple fraction, say q=(0.5234,0,0). In this case the structure strictly speaking has lost all translational symmetry in a particular direction. This is called an incommensurate structure.

== Causes ==
There are basically three types of superstructures in crystals:

=== Magnetic superstructures ===
When a crystalline material that contains atoms with uncompensated electron spins is cooled down, ordering of these spins generally occurs once the thermal energy is small enough not to overrule the interactions between neighboring spins. If the ordering does not exhibit the same symmetry as the original unit cell of the crystallographic lattice, a superstructure will result. In this case, the superspots are typically only visible in neutron diffraction patterns, because the neutron is scattered both by the nucleus and by the magnetic moments of the electron spins.

=== Defect ordering ===
Many alloys of elements that resemble each other chemically will form a structure at higher temperatures where the two elements occupy similar positions in the lattice at random. At lower temperatures ordering may occur where crystallographic positions are no longer equivalent because one element preferentially occupies one site and the other the other. This partial ordering process may lower the translation symmetry and result in a different, larger unit cell.

=== Displacive transitions ===
In some transitions a number of atoms occupying crystallographic positions that were originally equivalent will move away slightly from their ideal positions according to a certain pattern. This pattern or repeat motif may span multiple unit cells. The cause of this phenomenon is the small changes in chemical bonding that favor formations of semi-regular and larger clusters of atoms. Although having the undistorted substructure, these materials are typically 'unsaturated' in the sense that one of the bands in the band structure is only partially filled. The distortion changes the band structure, in part splitting the bands up into smaller bands that can be more completely filled or emptied to lower the energy of the system. In the case of a one-dimensional crystal, Peierls distortion results in the stabilization of a symmetry-breaking structure due to the introduction of new band gaps.

This process may not go to completion, however, because the substructure only allows for a certain amount of distortion. Superstructures of this type are often incommensurate. A good example is found in the structural transitions of 1T-TaS_{2}, a compound with a partially filled, narrow d band (Ta(IV) has a d^{1} configuration) .

== See also ==
- Overlayer
- LEED#Superstructures
