= Low-energy electron microscopy =

Low-energy electron microscopy, or LEEM, is an analytical surface science technique used to image atomically clean surfaces, atom-surface interactions, and thin (crystalline) films.

== Operation ==
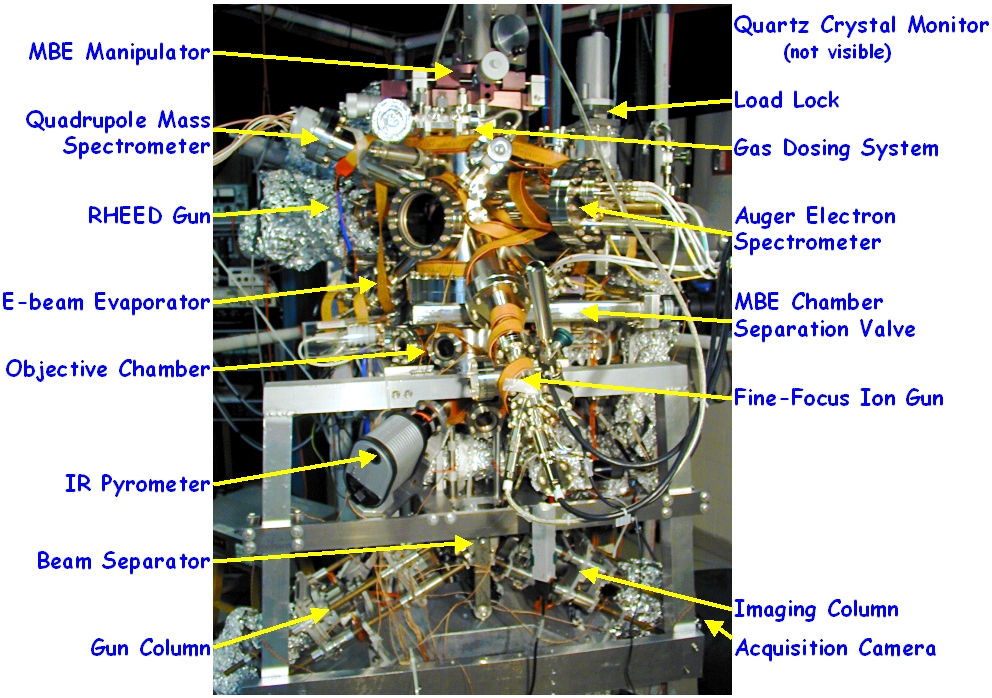
A low-energy electron microscope used for surface science studies at University of Illinois' Frederick Seitz Materials Research Laboratory in Urbana, IL, USA.

High-energy electrons (15-20 keV) are emitted from an electron gun, focused using a set of condenser optics, and sent through a magnetic beam deflector (usually 60˚ or 90˚). The "fast" electrons travel through an objective lens and begin decelerating to low energies (1-100 eV) near the sample surface because the sample is held at a potential near that of the gun. The low-energy electrons are now termed "surface-sensitive" and the near-surface sampling depth can be varied by tuning the energy of the incident electrons (difference between the sample and gun potentials minus the work functions of the sample and system). The low-energy elastically backscattered electrons travel back through the objective lens, reaccelerate to the gun voltage (because the objective lens is grounded), and pass through the beam separator again. However, now the electrons travel away from the condenser optics and into the projector lenses. Imaging of the back focal plane of the objective lens into the object plane of the projector lens (using an intermediate lens) produces a diffraction pattern (low-energy electron diffraction, LEED) at the imaging plane and recorded in a number of different ways. The intensity distribution of the diffraction pattern will depend on the periodicity at the sample surface and is a direct result of the wave nature of the electrons. One can produce individual images of the diffraction pattern spot intensities by turning off the intermediate lens and inserting a contrast aperture in the back focal plane of the objective lens (or, in state-of-the-art instruments, in the center of the separator, as chosen by the excitation of the objective lens), thus allowing for real-time observations of dynamic processes at surfaces. Such phenomena include (but are not limited to): tomography, phase transitions, adsorption, reaction, segregation, thin film growth, etching, strain relief, sublimation, and magnetic microstructure. These investigations are only possible because of the accessibility of the sample; allowing for a wide variety of in situ studies over a wide temperature range. LEEM was invented by Ernst Bauer in 1962; however, not fully developed (by Ernst Bauer and Wolfgang Telieps) until 1985.

== Introduction ==
LEEM differs from conventional electron microscopes in four main ways:

1. The sample must be illuminated on the same side of the imaging optics, i.e. through the objective lens, because samples are not transparent to low-energy electrons;
2. In order to separate the incident and elastically scattered low energy electrons, scientists use magnetic "electron prism" beam separators which focus electrons both in and out of the plane of the beampath (to avoid distortions in the image and diffraction patterns);
3. In electrostatic immersion objective lens brings the sample close to that of the gun, slowing down the high energy electrons to a desired energy only just before interacting with the sample surface;
4. The instrument must be able to work under ultra-high vacuum (UHV), or 10^{−10} torr (760 torr = 1 atm, atmospheric pressure), although "near-ambient pressure" (NAP-LEEM) instruments have been developed by adding a higher pressure compartment and differential pumping stages, allowing for sample room pressures up to 10^{−1} mbar.

== Surface diffraction ==
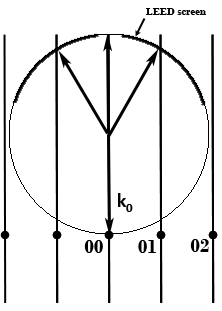
Ewald's sphere construction for the case of normal incidence of the primary electron beam. Here, this is done in a typical LEED set-up, however, in LEEM, there are complicated electron optics that allow for imaging of the resultant diffraction patterns and hence, the surface of the sample.

Kinematic or elastic backscattering occurs when low energy (1-100 eV) electrons impinge on a clean, well-ordered crystalline specimen. It is assumed that each electron undergoes only one scattering event, and incident electron beam is described as a plane wave with the wavelength:

$$\begin{align}
\lambda = \frac{h}{\sqrt{2mE}}, \qquad \lambda[\textrm{A}]=\sqrt{\frac{150}{E[\textrm{eV}]}}
\end{align}$$

Inverse space is used to describe the periodicity of the lattice and the interaction of the plane wave with the sample surface. In inverse (or "k-space") space, the wave vector of the incident and scattered waves are $\textbf{k}_0=2\pi/\lambda_0$ and
$$\begin{align}\textbf{k}=2\pi/\lambda\end{align}$$
, respectively, and constructive interference occurs at the Laue condition:

$$\textbf{k}-\textbf{k}_0 = \textbf{G}_\textrm{hkl}$$

where (h,k,l) is a set of integers and

$$\textbf{G}_\textrm{hkl} = h\textbf{a}^*+k\textbf{b}^*+l\textbf{c}^*$$

is a vector of the reciprocal lattice.

== Experimental setup ==
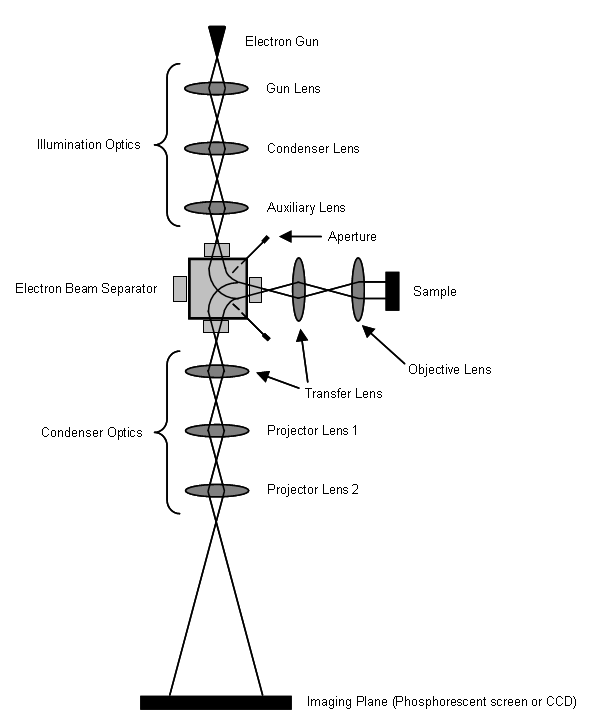
A typical LEEM/LEED lens and ray diagram.

A typical LEEM setup consists of electron gun, used to generate electrons by way of thermionic or field emission from a source tip. In thermionic emission, electrons escape a source tip (usually made of LaB_{6}) by resistive heating and application of an electric field to effectively lower the energy needed for electrons to escape the surface. Once sufficient thermal vibrational energy is attained electrons may overcome this electrostatic energy barrier, allowing them to travel into vacuum and accelerate down the lens column to the gun potential (because the lenses are at ground). In field emission, rather than heating the tip to vibrationally excite electrons from the surface, the source tip (usually tungsten) is sharpened to a small point such that when large electric fields are applied, they concentrate at the tip, lowering the barrier to escape the surface as well as making tunneling of electrons from the tip to vacuum level more feasible.

Condenser/illumination optics are used to focus electrons leaving the electron gun and manipulate and/or translate the illumination electron beam. Electromagnetic quadrupole electron lenses are used, the number of which depends on how much resolution and focusing flexibility the designer wishes. However, the ultimate resolution of LEEM is usually determined by that of the objective lens.

Illumination beam aperture allows researchers to control the area of the specimen which is illuminated (LEEM's version of electron microscopy's "selected area diffraction", termed microdiffraction) and is located in the beam separator on the illumination side.

Magnetic beam separator is needed to resolve the illuminating and imaging beam (while in turn spatially separating the optics for each). There has been much development on the technology of electron beam separators; the early separators introduced distortion in either the image or diffraction plane. However, IBM recently developed a hybrid prism array/nested quadratic field design, focusing the electron beams both in and out of the plane of the beampath, allowing for deflection and transfer of the image and diffraction planes without distortion or energy dispersion.

Electrostatic immersion objective lens is used to form a real image of the sample by way of a 2/3-magnification virtual image behind the sample. The uniformity of the electrostatic field between the objective lens and specimen, limited by spherical and chromatic aberrations larger than those of any other lenses, ultimately determines the overall performance of the instrument.

Contrast aperture is located in the center on the projector lens side of the beam separator. In most electron microscopies, the contrast aperture is introduced into the back focal plan of the objective lens (where the actual diffraction plane lies). However, this is not true in the LEEM, because dark-field imaging (imaging of nonspecular beams) would not be possible because the aperture has to move laterally and would intercept the incident beam for large shifts. Therefore, researchers adjust the excitation of the objective lens so as to produce an image of the diffraction pattern in the middle of the beam separator and choose the desired spot intensity to image using a contrast aperture inserted there. This aperture allows scientists to image diffraction intensities that may be of particular interest (dark field).

Illumination optics are employed to magnify the image or diffraction pattern and project it onto the imaging plate or screen. Imaging plate or screen used to image the electron intensity so that we can see it. This can be done many different ways including, phosphorescent screens, imaging plates, CCDs, among others.

== Specialized imaging techniques ==
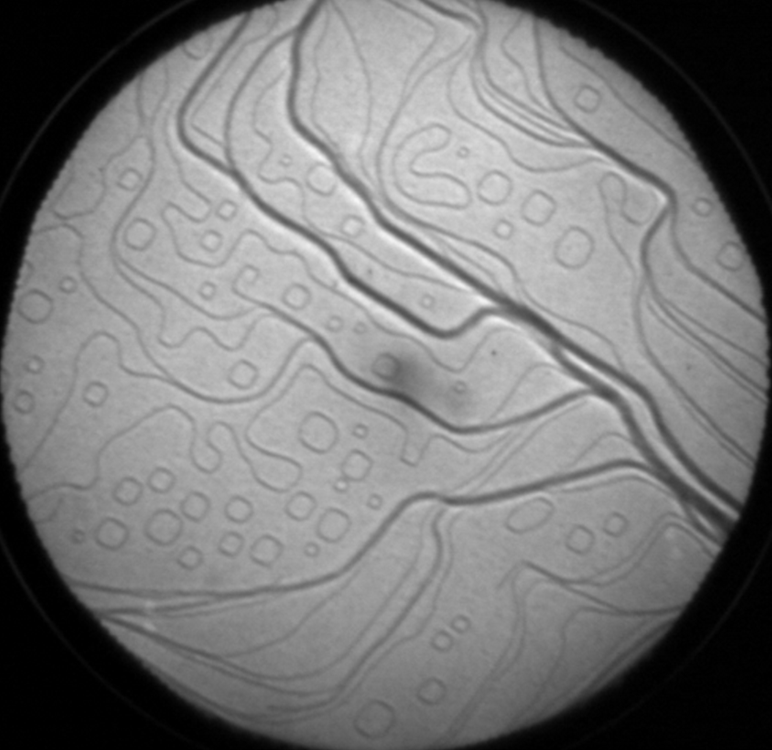
LEEM bright-field (step/phase contrast) image of Cr(100). Atomic steps, step bunches, islands and terraces are easily discernible from vertical diffraction contrast originating from the wave nature of electrons. Field of view is 5.6 μm.

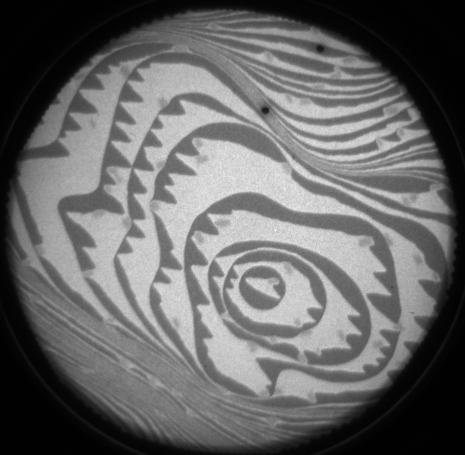
The LEEM image corresponding to a sub-monolayer palladium film (dark contrast) grown on the (110) surface of a tungsten crystal (bright contrast). The barely visible islands are tungsten carbides due to carbon contamination. Diameter of the imaged area is 10 micrometres.

=== Low energy electron diffraction (LEED) ===
After a parallel beam of low-energy electrons interacts with a specimen, the electrons form a diffraction or LEED pattern which depends on periodicity present at the surface and is a direct result of the wave nature of an electron. It is important to point out that in regular LEED the entire sample surface is being illuminated by a parallel beam of electrons, and thus the diffraction pattern will contain information about the entire surface.

LEED performed in a LEEM instrument (sometimes referred to as Very Low-Energy Electron Diffraction (VLEED), due to the even lower electron energies), limits the area illuminated to the beam spot, typically in the order of square micrometers. The diffraction pattern is formed in the back focal plane of the objective lens, imaged into the object plane of the projective lens (using an intermediate lens), and the final pattern appears on the phosphorescent screen, photographic plate or CCD.

As the reflected electrons are bent away from the electron source by the prism, the specular reflected electrons can be measured, even starting from zero landing energy, as no shadow of the source is visible on the screen (which prevents this in regular LEED instruments). It is worth noting that the spacing of diffracted beams does not increase with kinetic energy as for conventional LEED systems. This is due to the imaged electrons being accelerated to the high energy of the imaging column and are therefore imaged with a constant size of K-space regardless of the incident electron energy.

=== Microdiffraction ===
Microdiffraction is conceptually exactly like LEED. However, unlike in a LEED experiment where the sampled surface area is some square millimeters, one inserts the illumination and the beam aperture into the beam path while imaging a surface and thus reduces the size of the sampled surface area. The chosen area ranges from a fraction of a square micrometer to square micrometers. If the surface is not homogeneous, a diffraction pattern obtained from LEED experiment appears convoluted and is therefore hard to analyze. In a microdiffraction experiment researchers may focus on a particular island, terrace, domain and so on, and retrieve a diffraction pattern composed solely of a single surface feature, making the technique extremely useful.

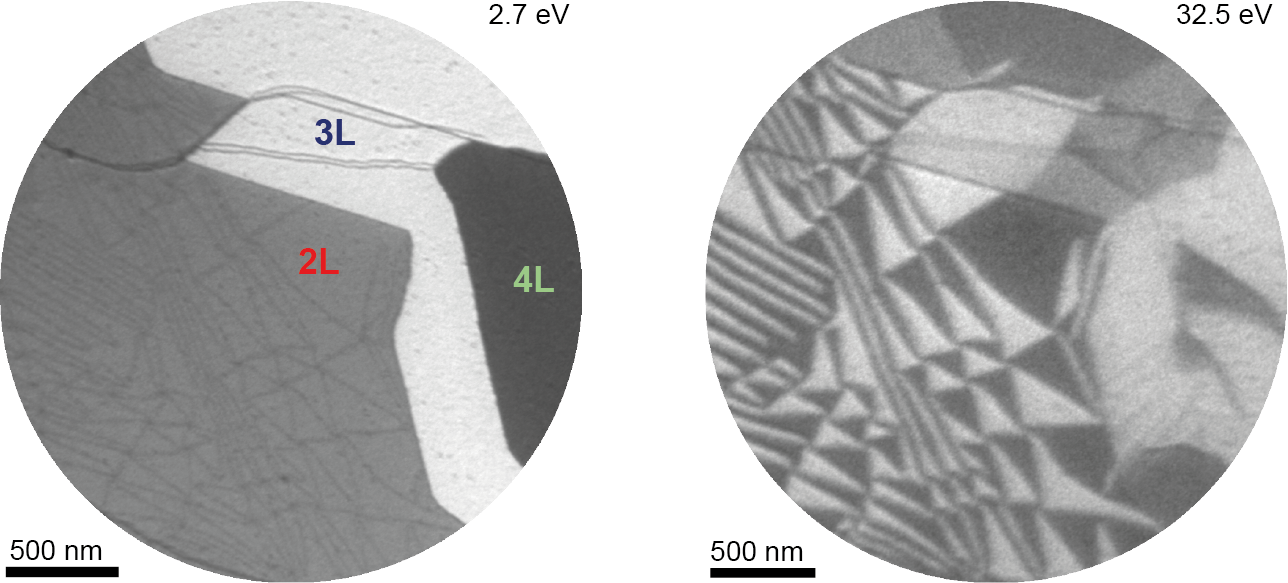
Graphene on SiC is composed of domains of different stacking order. (left) Bright-field LEEM micrograph of a samples of bilayer, trilayer, and four-layer intercalated graphene. (right) Dark-field images of the same area. Domains of alternating contrast are clearly visible, indicating areas of different stacking order. Adapted from

=== Bright field imaging ===
Bright Field imaging uses the specular, reflected, (0,0) beam to form an image. Also known as phase or interference contrast imaging, bright field imaging makes particular use of the wave nature of the electron to generate vertical diffraction contrast, making steps on the surface visible.

=== Dark field imaging ===
In dark field imaging (also termed diffraction contrast imaging) researchers choose a desired diffraction spot and use a contrast aperture to pass only those electrons that contribute to that particular spot. In the image planes after the contrast aperture it is then possible to observe where the electrons originate from in real space. This technique allows scientists to study on which areas of a specimen a structure with a certain lattice vector (periodicity) exists.

=== Spectroscopy ===
Both (micro-)diffraction as well as bright field and dark field imaging can be performed as a function of the electron landing energy, measuring a diffraction pattern or an image for a range of energies. This way of measuring (often called LEEM-IV) yields spectra for each diffraction spot or sample position. In its simplest form, this spectrum gives a "fingerprint" of the surface, enabling the identification of different surface structures.

A particular application of bright field spectroscopy is the counting of the exact number of layers in layered materials such as (few layer) graphene, hexagonal boron nitride and some transition metal dichalcogenides.

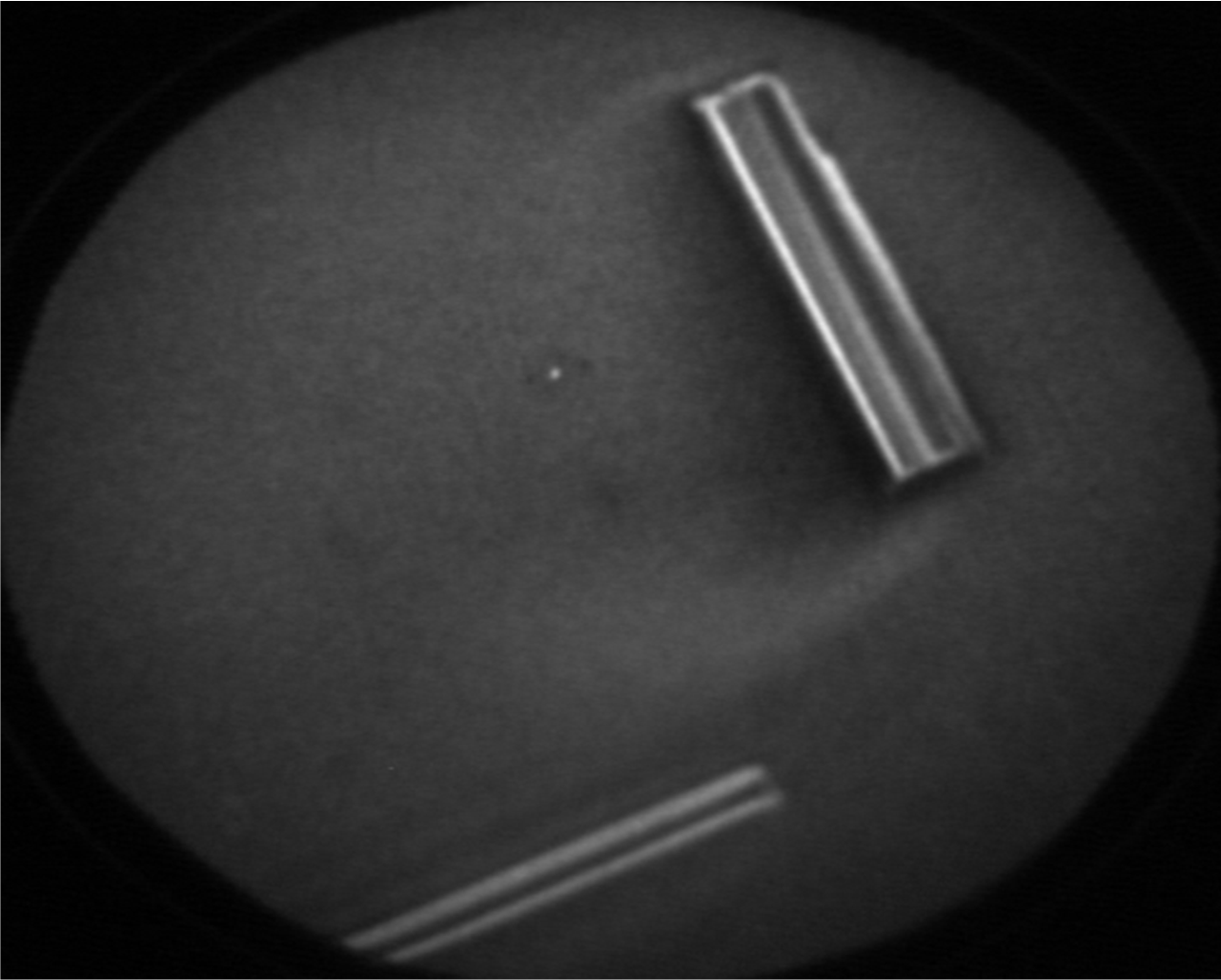
Photoexcitation electron microscopy (PEEM) of Ag rods on Si. Here, an Hg lamp produces photons of energy just above the work function threshold of Ag, and the resultant secondary electron emission is imaged.

=== Photoemission electron microscopy (PEEM) ===
In photoemission electron microscopy (PEEM), upon exposure to electromagnetic radiation (photons), secondary electrons are excited from the surface and imaged. PEEM was first developed in the early 1930s, using ultraviolet (UV) light to induce photoemission of (secondary) electrons. However, since then, this technique has made many advances, the most important of which was the pairing of PEEM with a synchrotron light source, providing tunable, linear polarized, left and right circularized radiation in the soft x-ray range. Such application allows scientist to retrieve topographical, elemental, chemical, and magnetic contrast of surfaces.

LEEM instruments are often equipped with light sources to perform PEEM imaging. This helps in system alignment and enables collection LEEM, PEEM and ARPES data of a single sample in a single instrument.

=== Mirror electron microscopy (MEM) ===
In mirror electron microscopy, electrons are slowed in the retarding field of the condenser lens to the limit of the instrument and thus, only allowed to interact with the "near-surface" region of the sample. It is very complicated to understand the exact contrast variations come from, but the important things to point out here are that height variations at the surface of the region change the properties of the retarding field, therefore influencing the reflected (specular) beam. No LEED pattern is formed, because no scattering events have taken place, and therefore, reflected intensity is high.

=== Low-energy electron holography ===
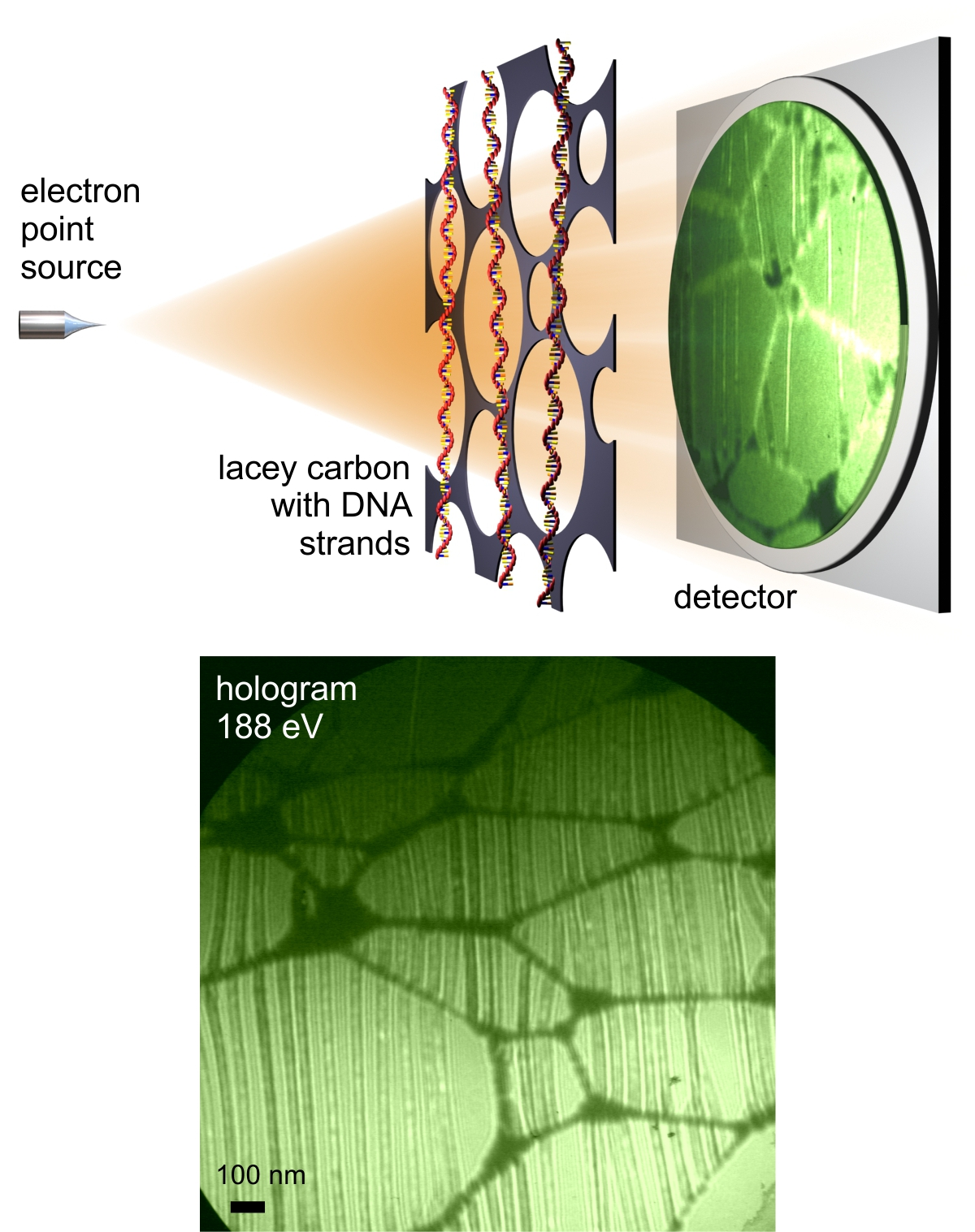
Low-energy electron holography of DNA molecules stretched over lacey carbon. Adapted from Latychevskaia et al.

Low-energy electron holography is realized with electron with kinetic energies in the range 30 - 250 eV. The source of the coherent electron beam is a sharp metal tip and the electrons are extracted by field emission. The wave transmitted through the sample propagates to the detector where the interference pattern is acquired, formed by superposition of the scattered with the non-scattered (reference) wave, constituting an in-line hologram. The structure of the object (macromolecule) is then reconstructed from the hologram by numerical methods. Low-energy electron holography has successfully been applied for imaging of individual biological molecules, including: purple protein membrane, DNA molecules, phthalocyaninato polysiloxane molecules, the tobacco mosaic virus8, a bacteriophage, ferritin and individual proteins (bovine serum albumin, cytochrome C and hemoglobin). The resolution achieved by low-energy electron holography is about 0.7 - 1 nm.

=== Reflectivity contrast imaging ===
The elastic backscattering of low energy electrons from surfaces is strong. The reflectivity coefficients of surfaces depend strongly on the energy of incident electrons and the nuclear charge, in a non-monotonic fashion. Therefore, contrast can be maximized by varying the energy of the electrons incident at the surface.

=== Spin-polarized LEEM (SPLEEM) ===
SPLEEM uses spin-polarized illumination electrons to image the magnetic structure of a surface by way of spin–spin coupling of the incident electrons with that of the surface.

=== Low-Energy Electron Potentiometry (LEEP) ===
LEEP is a technique that enables one to determine local variations in the work function and/or in the electrostatic potential (if a lateral voltage bias is present). For this, LEEM IVs (or spectra) at different locations are measured. Their respective shifts form a direct measure for position-dependent differences in work function and/or potential.

=== Angle-Resolved Reflected Electron Spectroscopy (ARRES) ===
In ARRES, LEEM IVs are measured for different energies and angles of the incoming electron beam. Since the beam angle is directly related to the in-plane electron momentum, ARRES allows one to find $E(k_x, k_y)$ dispersion curves for unoccupied electron states with energies above the vacuum energy.

=== Transmission Electron Microscopy at LEEM energies ===
Although LEEM itself is a reflection-based technique, transmission-based EM at similar energies has also been pioneered, e.g. via low-energy electron holography (above), and eV-TEM (electronVolt TEM). In eV-TEM, an electron source is placed behind a thin sample (such as graphene), and the low-energy electrons (0-50 eV, typically) transmitted are imaged using the electron optics of an existing LEEM instrument.
