= Reflection high-energy electron diffraction =

Electron diffraction by reflection from surfaces

Reflection high-energy electron diffraction (RHEED) is a technique used to characterize the surface of crystalline materials. RHEED systems gather information only from the surface layer of the sample, which distinguishes RHEED from other materials characterization methods that also rely on diffraction of high-energy electrons. Transmission electron microscopy, another common electron diffraction method samples mainly the bulk of the sample due to the geometry of the system, although in special cases it can provide surface information. Low-energy electron diffraction (LEED) is also surface sensitive, but LEED achieves surface sensitivity through the use of low energy electrons.

== Introduction ==
A RHEED system requires an electron source (gun), photoluminescent detector screen and a sample with a clean surface, although modern RHEED systems have additional parts to optimize the technique. The electron gun generates a beam of electrons which strike the sample at a very small angle relative to the sample surface. Incident electrons diffract from atoms at the surface of the sample, and a small fraction of the diffracted electrons interfere constructively at specific angles and form regular patterns on the detector. The electrons interfere according to the position of atoms on the sample surface, so the diffraction pattern at the detector is a function of the sample surface. Figure 1 shows the most basic setup of a RHEED system.

Figure 1. Systematic setup of the electron gun, sample and detector/CCD components of a RHEED system. Electrons follow the path indicated by the arrow and approach the sample at angle θ. The sample surface diffracts electrons, and some of these diffracted electrons reach the detector and form the RHEED pattern. The reflected (specular) beam follows the path from the sample to the detector.

== Surface diffraction ==
In the RHEED setup, only atoms at the sample surface contribute to the RHEED pattern. The glancing angle of incident electrons allows them to escape the bulk of the sample and to reach the detector. Atoms at the sample surface diffract (scatter) the incident electrons due to the wavelike properties of electrons.

The diffracted electrons interfere constructively at specific angles according to the crystal structure and spacing of the atoms at the sample surface and the wavelength of the incident electrons. Some of the electron waves created by constructive interference collide with the detector, creating specific diffraction patterns according to the surface features of the sample. Users characterize the crystallography of the sample surface through analysis of the diffraction patterns. Figure 2 shows a RHEED pattern. Video 1 depicts a metrology instrument recording the RHEED intensity oscillations and deposition rate for process control and analysis.

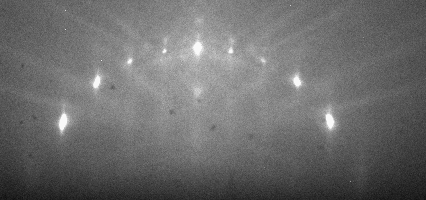
Figure 2. A RHEED pattern obtained from electron diffraction from a clean TiO2 (110) surface. The bright spots indicate where many electrons reach the detector. The lines that can be observed are Kikuchi Lines.

Two types of diffraction contribute to RHEED patterns. Some incident electrons undergo a single, elastic scattering event at the crystal surface, a process termed kinematic scattering. Dynamic scattering occurs when electrons undergo multiple diffraction events in the crystal and lose some of their energy due to interactions with the sample. Users extract non-qualitative data from the kinematically diffracted electrons. These electrons account for the high intensity spots or rings common to RHEED patterns. RHEED users also analyze dynamically scattered electrons with complex techniques and models to gather quantitative information from RHEED patterns.

=== Kinematic scattering analysis ===
RHEED users construct Ewald's spheres to find the crystallographic properties of the sample surface. Ewald's spheres show the allowed diffraction conditions for kinematically scattered electrons in a given RHEED setup. The diffraction pattern at the screen relates to the Ewald's sphere geometry, so RHEED users can directly calculate the reciprocal lattice of the sample with a RHEED pattern, the energy of the incident electrons and the distance from the detector to the sample. The user must relate the geometry and spacing of the spots of a perfect pattern to the Ewald's sphere in order to determine the reciprocal lattice of the sample surface.

The Ewald's sphere analysis is similar to that for bulk crystals, however the reciprocal lattice for the sample differs from that for a 3D material due to the surface sensitivity of the RHEED process. The reciprocal lattices of bulk crystals consist of a set of points in 3D space. However, only the first few layers of the material contribute to the diffraction in RHEED, so there are no diffraction conditions in the dimension perpendicular to the sample surface. Due to the lack of a third diffracting condition, the reciprocal lattice of a crystal surface is a series of infinite rods extending perpendicular to the sample's surface. These rods originate at the conventional 2D reciprocal lattice points of the sample's surface.

The Ewald's sphere is centered on the sample surface with a radius equal to the magnitude of the wavevector of the incident electrons,

$k_i=\frac{2\pi}{\lambda}$,

where λ is the electrons' de Broglie wavelength.

Figure 3. The construction of the Ewald's sphere for elastic diffraction in RHEED. The radius of the Ewald's sphere is equal to the magnitude of the incoming electron's wave vector k_{i}, which ends at the origin of the two-dimensional reciprocal lattice. The wave vector of the outgoing electron k_{hl} corresponds to an allowed diffraction condition, and the difference between the components parallel to the surface of the two wave vectors is the reciprocal lattice vector G_{hl}.

Diffraction conditions are satisfied where the rods of reciprocal lattice intersect the Ewald's sphere. Therefore, the magnitude of a vector from the origin of the Ewald's sphere to the intersection of any reciprocal lattice rods is equal in magnitude to that of the incident beam. This is expressed as

$|k_{hl}|=|k_{i}|$ (2)

Here, k_{hl} is the wave vector of the elastically diffracted electrons of the order (hl) at any intersection of reciprocal lattice rods with Ewald's sphere

The projections of the two vectors onto the plane of the sample's surface differ by a reciprocal lattice vector G_{hl},

$G_{hl}=k^{||}_{hl}-k^{||}_{i}$ (3)

Figure 3 shows the construction of the Ewald's sphere and provides examples of the G, k_{hl} and k_{i} vectors.

Many of the reciprocal lattice rods meet the diffraction condition, however the RHEED system is designed such that only the low orders of diffraction are incident on the detector. The RHEED pattern at the detector is a projection only of the k vectors that are within the angular range that contains the detector. The size and position of the detector determine which of the diffracted electrons are within the angular range that reaches the detector, so the geometry of the RHEED pattern can be related back to the geometry of the reciprocal lattice of the sample surface through use of trigonometric relations and the distance from the sample to detector.

The k vectors are labeled such that the vector k00 that forms the smallest angle with the sample surface is called the 0th order beam. The 0th order beam is also known as the specular beam. Each successive intersection of a rod and the sphere further from the sample surface is labeled as a higher order reflection. Because of the way the center of the Ewald's sphere is positioned, the specular beam forms the same angle with the substrate as the incident electron beam. The specular point has the greatest intensity on a RHEED pattern and is labeled as the (00) point by convention. The other points on the RHEED pattern are indexed according to the reflection order they project.

The radius of the Ewald's sphere is much larger than the spacing between reciprocal lattice rods because the incident beam has a very short wavelength due to its high-energy electrons. Rows of reciprocal lattice rods actually intersect the Ewald's sphere as an approximate plane because identical rows of parallel reciprocal lattice rods sit directly in front and behind the single row shown. Figure 3 shows a cross sectional view of a single row of reciprocal lattice rods filling of the diffraction conditions. The reciprocal lattice rods in Figure 3 show the end on view of these planes, which are perpendicular to the computer screen in the figure.

The intersections of these effective planes with the Ewald's sphere forms circles, called Laue circles. The RHEED pattern is a collection of points on the perimeters of concentric Laue circles around the center point. However, interference effects between the diffracted electrons still yield strong intensities at single points on each Laue circle. Figure 4 shows the intersection of one of these planes with the Ewald's Sphere.

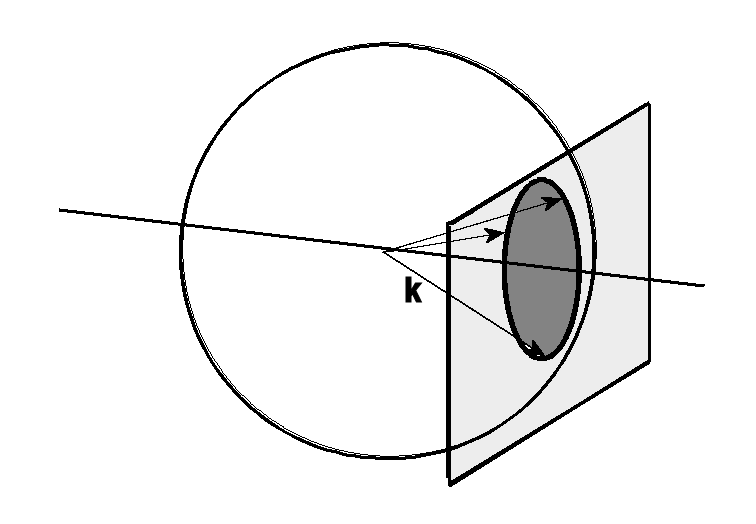
Figure 4. Diffraction from a row of atoms a Laue circle on the surface of the Ewald's sphere. The reciprocal lattice rods are so closely space, that they comprise the plane cutting the sphere. Diffraction conditions are fulfilled on the perimeter of the Laue circle. The vectors are all equal to the reciprocal of the incident vector, k.

The azimuthal angle affects the geometry and intensity of RHEED patterns. The azimuthal angle is the angle at which the incident electrons intersect the ordered crystal lattice on the surface of the sample. Most RHEED systems are equipped with a sample holder that can rotate the crystal around an axis perpendicular to the sample surface. RHEED users rotate the sample to optimize the intensity profiles of patterns. Users generally index at least 2 RHEED scans at different azimuth angles for reliable characterization of the crystal's surface structure. Figure 5 shows a schematic diagram of an electron beam incident on the sample at different azimuth angles.

Figure 5. The incident electron beam is incident on an identical surface structure at a different azimuth angles in a) and b). The sample is viewed from the top in the figure, and the points correspond to the reciprocal lattice rods, which extend out of the screen. The RHEED pattern would be different for each azimuth angle.

Users sometimes rotate the sample around an axis perpendicular to the sampling surface during RHEED experiments to create a RHEED pattern called the azimuthal plot. Rotating the sample changes the intensity of the diffracted beams due to their dependence on the azimuth angle. RHEED specialists characterize film morphologies by measuring the changes in beam intensity and comparing these changes to theoretical calculations, which can effectively model the dependence of the intensity of diffracted beams on the azimuth angle.

=== Dynamic scattering analysis ===
The dynamically, or inelastically, scattered electrons provide several types of information about the sample as well. The brightness or intensity at a point on the detector depends on dynamic scattering, so all analysis involving the intensity must account for dynamic scattering. Some inelastically scattered electrons penetrate the bulk crystal and fulfill Bragg diffraction conditions. These inelastically scattered electrons can reach the detector to yield Kikuchi diffraction patterns, which are useful for calculating diffraction conditions. Kikuchi patterns are characterized by lines connecting the intense diffraction points on a RHEED pattern. Figure 6 shows a RHEED pattern with visible Kikuchi lines.

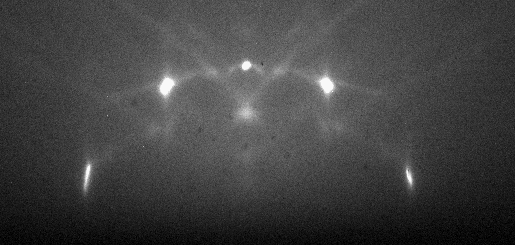
Figure 6. A RHEED pattern from a TiO_{2} (110) surface with visible Kikuchi lines. The Kikuchi lines pass through the Laue circles and appear to radiate from the center of the pattern.

== RHEED system requirements ==
=== Electron gun ===
The electron gun is one of the most important piece of equipment in a RHEED system. The gun limits the resolution and testing limits of the system. Tungsten filaments are the primary electron source for the electron gun of most RHEED systems due to the low work function of tungsten. In the typical setup, the tungsten filament is the cathode and a positively biased anode draws electrons from the tip of the tungsten filament.

The magnitude of the anode bias determines the energy of the incident electrons. The optimal anode bias is dependent upon the type of information desired. At large incident angles, electrons with high energy can penetrate the surface of the sample and degrade the surface sensitivity of the instrument. However, the dimensions of the Laue zones are proportional to the inverse square of the electron energy meaning that more information is recorded at the detector at higher incident electron energies. For general surface characterization, the electron gun is operated the range of 10-30 keV.

In a typical RHEED setup, one magnetic and one electric field focus the incident beam of electrons. A negatively biased Wehnelt electrode positioned between the cathode filament and anode applies a small electric field, which focuses the electrons as they pass through the anode. An adjustable magnetic lens focuses the electrons onto the sample surface after they pass through the anode. A typical RHEED source has a focal length around 50 cm. The beam is focused to the smallest possible point at the detector rather than the sample surface so that the diffraction pattern has the best resolution.

Phosphor screens that exhibit photoluminescence are widely used as detectors. These detectors emit green light from areas where electrons hit their surface and are common to TEM as well. The detector screen is useful for aligning the pattern to an optimal position and intensity. CCD cameras capture the patterns to allow for digital analysis.

=== Sample surface ===
The sample surface must be extremely clean for effective RHEED experiments. Contaminants on the sample surface interfere with the electron beam and degrade the quality of the RHEED pattern. RHEED users employ two main techniques to create clean sample surfaces. Small samples can be cleaved in the vacuum chamber prior to RHEED analysis. The newly exposed, cleaved surface is analyzed. Large samples, or those that are not able to be cleaved prior to RHEED analysis can be coated with a passive oxide layer prior to analysis. Subsequent heat treatment under the vacuum of the RHEED chamber removes the oxide layer and exposes the clean sample surface.

=== Vacuum requirements ===
Because gas molecules diffract electrons and affect the quality of the electron gun, RHEED experiments are performed under vacuum. The RHEED system must operate at a pressure low enough to prevent significant scattering of the electron beams by gas molecules in the chamber. At electron energies of 10 keV, a chamber pressure of 10^{−5} mbar or lower is necessary to prevent significant scattering of electrons by the background gas. In practice, RHEED systems are operated under ultra high vacuums. The chamber pressure is minimized as much as possible in order to optimize the process. The vacuum conditions limit the types of materials and processes that can be monitored in situ with RHEED.

== RHEED patterns of real surfaces ==
Previous analysis focused only on diffraction from a perfectly flat surface of a crystal surface. However, non-flat surfaces add additional diffraction conditions to RHEED analysis.

Streaked or elongated spots are common to RHEED patterns. As Fig 3 shows, the reciprocal lattice rods with the lowest orders intersect the Ewald sphere at very small angles, so the intersection between the rods and sphere is not a singular point if the sphere and rods have thickness. The incident electron beam diverges and electrons in the beam have a range of energies, so in practice, the Ewald sphere is not infinitely thin as it is theoretically modeled. The reciprocal lattice rods have a finite thickness as well, with their diameters dependent on the quality of the sample surface. Streaks appear in the place of perfect points when broadened rods intersect the Ewald sphere. Diffraction conditions are fulfilled over the entire intersection of the rods with the sphere, yielding elongated points or ‘streaks’ along the vertical axis of the RHEED pattern. In real cases, streaky RHEED patterns indicate a flat sample surface while the broadening of the streaks indicate small area of coherence on the surface.

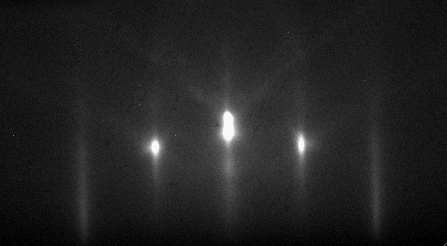
Figure 7. Streaked RHEED pattern from the TiO_{2} (110) surface. The sample had a terraced surface, which caused noticeable streaking compared to the RHEED pattern from the flat TiO_{2} (110) surface shown above.

Surface features and polycrystalline surfaces add complexity or change RHEED patterns from those from perfectly flat surfaces. Growing films, nucleating particles, crystal twinning, grains of varying size and adsorbed species add complicated diffraction conditions to those of a perfect surface. Superimposed patterns of the substrate and heterogeneous materials, complex interference patterns and degradation of the resolution are characteristic of complex surfaces or those partially covered with heterogeneous materials.

== Specialized RHEED techniques ==
=== Film growth ===
RHEED is an extremely popular technique for monitoring the growth of thin films. In particular, RHEED is well suited for use with molecular beam epitaxy (MBE), a process used to form high quality, ultrapure thin films under ultrahigh vacuum growth conditions. The intensities of individual spots on the RHEED pattern fluctuate in a periodic manner as a result of the relative surface coverage of the growing thin film. Figure 8 shows an example of the intensity fluctuating at a single RHEED point during MBE growth.

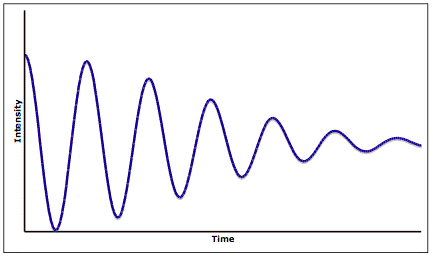
Figure 8. The curve is a rough model of the fluctuation of the intensity of a single RHEED point during MBE deposition. Each peak represents the forming of a new monolayer. Since the degree of order is at a maximum once a new monolayer has been formed, the spots in the diffraction pattern have maximum intensity since the maximum number of diffraction centers of the new layer contribute to the diffracted beam. The overall intensity of the oscillations is dropping the more layers are grown. This is because the electron beam was focused on the original surface and gets out of focus the more layers are grown. Note that the figure is only a model similar in shape to those used by film growth experts.

Each full period corresponds to formation of a single atomic layer thin film. The oscillation period is highly dependent on the material system, electron energy and incident angle, so researchers obtain empirical data to correlate the intensity oscillations and film coverage before using RHEED for monitoring film growth.

Video 1 depicts a metrology instrument recording the RHEED intensity oscillations and deposition rate for process control and analysis.

Video 1: RHEED Oscillations on kSA 400 analytical RHEED system

=== RHEED-TRAXS ===
Reflection high energy electron diffraction - total reflection angle X-ray spectroscopy is a technique for monitoring the chemical composition of crystals. RHEED-TRAXS analyzes X-ray spectral lines emitted from a crystal as a result of electrons from a RHEED gun colliding with the surface.

RHEED-TRAXS is preferential to X-ray microanalysis (XMA)(such as EDS and WDS) because the incidence angle of the electrons on the surface is very small, typically less than 5°. As a result, the electrons do not penetrate deeply into the crystal, meaning the X-ray emission is restricted to the top of the crystal, allowing for real-time, in-situ monitoring of surface stoichiometry.

The experimental setup is fairly simple. Electrons are fired onto a sample causing X-ray emission. These X-rays are then detected using a silicon-lithium Si-Li crystal placed behind beryllium windows, used to maintain vacuum.

=== MCP-RHEED ===
MCP-RHEED is a system in which an electron beam is amplified by a micro-channel plate (MCP). This system consists of an electron gun and an MCP equipped with a fluorescent screen opposite to the electron gun. Because of the amplification, the intensity of the electron beam can be decreased by several orders of magnitude and the damage to the samples is diminished. This method is used to observe the growth of insulator crystals such as organic films and alkali halide films, which are easily damaged by electron beams.
