= Spycatcher (disambiguation) =

Spycatcher (or Spycatcher: The Candid Autobiography of a Senior Intelligence Officer) is a book by former MI5 officer Peter Wright

Spycatcher may also refer to:

- Counterintelligence agents, those who catch spies.
- SpyCatcher protein, forming a covalent bond to SpyTag peptide.
- Spycatcher (TV Series), a 1959 BBC series, based on the eponymous 1952 memoir by Oreste Pinto
- "Spy Catcher" (Spyforce episode), pilot episode of Australian TV series Spyforce
- Spycatcher (2011 novel) a spy novel written under the pseudonym William Morrow, by Matthew Dunn (author)
- "Spy Catcher Club", a fictional school club found in the children's novel and franchise Harriet the Spy

== See also ==
- Spy (disambiguation)
- Catcher (disambiguation)
- Category:Counterintelligence analysts
- The Catcher Was a Spy (1994 book) biography about Moe Berg
  - The Catcher Was a Spy (film) 2018 biopic
