= Scherrer equation =

Formula in X-ray diffraction and crystallography

The Scherrer equation, in X-ray diffraction and crystallography, is a formula that relates the size of sub-micrometre crystallites in a solid to the broadening of a peak in a diffraction pattern. It is often referred to, incorrectly, as a formula for particle size measurement or analysis. It is named after Paul Scherrer. It is used in the determination of size of crystals in the form of powder.

The Scherrer equation can be written as:

$$\tau = \frac {K \lambda}{\beta \cos \theta}$$

where:

- $\tau$ is the mean size of the ordered (crystalline) domains, which may be smaller or equal to the grain size;
- $K$ is a dimensionless shape factor, with a value close to unity. The shape factor has a typical value of about 0.9, but varies with the actual shape of the crystallite;
- $\lambda$ is the X-ray wavelength;
- $\beta$ is the line broadening at half the maximum intensity (FWHM), after subtracting the instrumental line broadening, in radians. This quantity is also sometimes denoted as $\Delta\left( 2\theta\right)$;
- $\theta$ is the Bragg angle.

== Applicability ==
The Scherrer equation is limited to nano-scale crystallites, or more-strictly, the coherently scattering domain size, which can be smaller than the crystallite size (due to factors mentioned below). It is not applicable to grains larger than about 0.1 to 0.2 μm, which precludes those observed in most metallographic and ceramographic microstructures.

The Scherrer equation provides a lower bound on the coherently scattering domain size, referred to here as the crystallite size for readability. The reason for this is that a variety of factors can contribute to the width of a diffraction peak besides instrumental effects and crystallite size; the most important of these are usually inhomogeneous strain and crystal lattice imperfections. The following sources of peak broadening are dislocations, stacking faults, twinning, microstresses, grain boundaries, sub-boundaries, coherency strain, chemical heterogeneities, and crystallite smallness. These and other imperfections may also result in peak shift, peak asymmetry, anisotropic peak broadening, or other peak shape effects.

If all of these other contributions to the peak width, including instrumental broadening, were zero, then the peak width would be determined solely by the crystallite size and the Scherrer equation would apply. If the other contributions to the width are non-zero, then the crystallite size can be larger than that predicted by the Scherrer equation, with the "extra" peak width coming from the other factors. The concept of crystallinity can be used to collectively describe the effect of crystal size and imperfections on peak broadening.

Although "particle size" is often used in reference to crystallite size, this term should not be used in association with the Scherrer method because particles are often agglomerations of many crystallites, and XRD gives no information on the particle size. Other techniques, such as sieving, image analysis, or visible light scattering do directly measure particle size. The crystallite size can be thought of as a lower limit of particle size.

== Derivation for a simple stack of planes ==
To see where the Scherrer equation comes from, it is useful to consider the simplest possible example: a set of N planes separated by the distance, a. The derivation for this simple, effectively one-dimensional case, is straightforward. First, the structure factor for this case is derived, and then an expression for the peak widths is determined.

=== Structure factor for a set of N equally spaced planes ===
This system, effectively a one dimensional perfect crystal, has a structure factor or scattering function S(q):

$S(q) = \frac{1}{N} \sum_{j,k=1}^N \mathrm{e}^{-i q(x_j-x_k)}$

where for N planes, $x_j=aj$:

$S(q) = \frac{1}{N} \sum_{k=1}^N \mathrm{e}^{-iqak}\times \sum_{j=1}^N \mathrm{e}^{iqaj}$

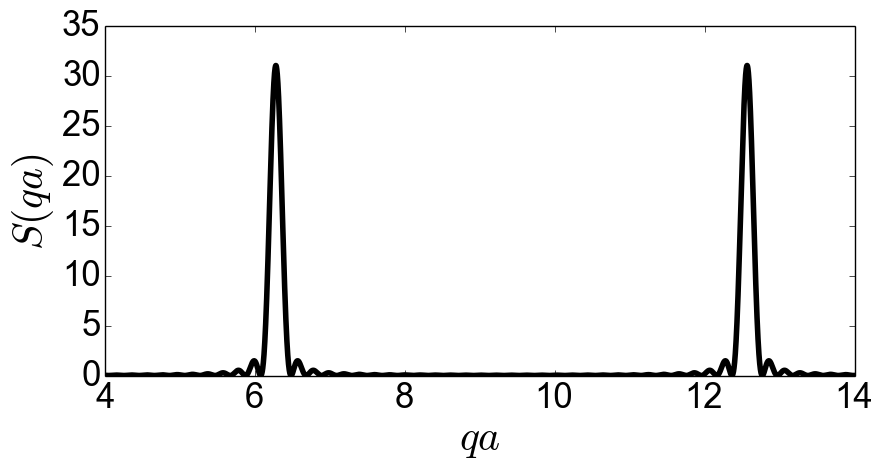
Structure factor S(qa) for N = 31 planes. Shown are the first and second Bragg peaks. It is worth noting that for a perfect but finite lattice, all peaks are identical. In particular, the peaks all have the same width. Also, the central part (between bracketing zeros) of each peak is close to a Gaussian function, but the envelope of the small oscillations either side of this peak is a Lorentzian function.

each sum is a simple geometric series, defining $y=\exp(iqa)$, $\sum_{j=1}^N y^j=(y-y^{N+1})/(1-y)$, and the other series analogously gives:

$S(q)=\frac{1}{N}\frac{\left[{\rm e}^{-iqa}-{\rm e}^{-iqa(N+1)}\right]}{\left[1-e^{-iqa}\right]}\times \frac{\left[{\rm e}^{iqa}-{\rm e}^{iqa(N+1)}\right]}{\left[1-e^{iqa}\right]}$

$S(q)=\frac{1}{N}\frac{2-{\rm e}^{iqaN}-{\rm e}^{-iqaN}}{2-{\rm e}^{iqa}-{\rm e}^{-iqa}}$

which is further simplified by converting to trigonometric functions:

$S(q) = \frac{1}{N}\frac{1-\cos[Nqa]}{1-\cos[qa]}$

and finally:

$S(q) = \frac{1}{N}\frac{\sin^2[Nqa/2]}{\sin^2[qa/2]}$

which gives a set of peaks at $q_P=0, 2\pi/a, 4\pi/a, \ldots$, all with heights $S(q_P)=N$.

=== Determination of the profile near the peak, and hence the peak width ===
From the definition of FWHM, for a peak at $q_P$ and with a FWHM of $\Delta q$, $S(q_P\pm\Delta q/2)=S(q_P)/2=N/2$, as the peak height is N. If we take the plus sign (peak is symmetric so either sign will do)

$S(q_P+\Delta q/2)=\frac{1}{N}\frac{\sin^2[Na(q_P+\Delta q/2)/2]}{\sin^2[a(q_P+\Delta q/2)/2]}=\frac{1}{N}\left[\frac{\sin[Na(q_P+\Delta q/2)/2]}{\sin[a(q_P+\Delta q/2)/2]}\right]^2=N/2$

and

$\frac{\sin[Na(q_P+\Delta q/2)/2]}{\sin[a(q_P+\Delta q/2)/2]} =\frac{\sin[Na\Delta q/4]}{\sin[a\Delta q/4]} =\frac{N}{2^{1/2}}$

if N is not too small. If $\Delta q$ is small, then $\sin[\Delta qa/4]\simeq \Delta qa/4$, and we can write the equation as a single non-linear equation $\sin(x)-(x/2^{1/2})=0$, for $x=Na\Delta q/4$. The solution to this equation is $x=1.39$. Therefore, the size of the set of planes is related to the FWHM in q by

$\tau=Na=\frac{5.56}{\Delta q}$

To convert to an expression for crystal size in terms of the peak width in the scattering angle $2\theta$ used in X-ray powder diffraction, we note that the scattering vector $q=(4\pi/\lambda)\sin(\theta/2)$, where the $\theta$ here is the angle between the incident wavevector and the scattered wavevector, which is different from the $\theta$ in the $2\theta$ scan. Then the peak width in the variable $2\theta$ is approximately $\beta\simeq 2\Delta q /[{\rm d}q/{\rm d} \theta]=2\Delta q/[(4\pi/\lambda)\cos(\theta)]$, and so

$\tau=Na=\frac{5.56\lambda}{2\pi\beta\cos(\theta)}=\frac{0.88\lambda}{\beta\cos(\theta)}$

which is the Scherrer equation with K = 0.88.

This only applies to a perfect 1D set of planes. In the experimentally relevant 3D case, the form of $S(q)$ and hence the peaks, depends on the crystal lattice type, and the size and shape of the nanocrystallite. The underlying mathematics becomes more involved than in this simple illustrative example. However, for simple lattices and shapes, expressions have been obtained for the FWHM, for example by Patterson. Just as in 1D, the FWHM varies as the inverse of the characteristic size. For example, for a spherical crystallite with a cubic lattice, the factor of 5.56 simply becomes 6.96, when the size is the diameter D, i.e., the diameter of a spherical nanocrystal is related to the peak FWHM by

$D=\frac{6.96}{\Delta q}$ or in $\theta$: $D=\frac{1.11\lambda}{\beta\cos(\theta)}$

== Peak broadening due to disorder of the second kind ==
The finite size of a crystal is not the only possible reason for broadened peaks in X-ray diffraction. Fluctuations of atoms about the ideal lattice positions that preserve the long-range order of the lattice only give rise to the Debye-Waller factor, which reduces peak heights but does not broaden them. However, fluctuations that cause the correlations between nearby atoms to decrease as their separation increases, does broaden peaks. This can be studied and quantified using the same simple one-dimensional stack of planes as above. The derivation follows that in chapter 9 of Guinier's textbook. This model was pioneered by and applied to a number of materials by Hosemann and collaborators over a number of years. They termed this disorder of the second kind, and referred to this imperfect crystalline ordering as paracrystalline ordering. Disorder of the first kind is the source of the Debye-Waller factor.

To derive the model we start with the definition of the structure factor

$S(q) = \frac{1}{N} \sum_{j,k=1}^N \mathrm{e}^{-i q(x_j-x_k)}$

but now we want to consider, for simplicity an infinite crystal, i.e., $N\to\infty$, and we want to consider pairs of lattice sites. For large $N$, for each of these $N$ planes, there are two neighbours $m$ planes away, so the above double sum becomes a single sum over pairs of neighbours either side of an atom, at positions $-m$ and $m$ lattice spacings away, times $N$. So, then

$S(q) = 1+ \frac{2}{N} \sum_{m=1}^N\int_{-\infty}^{\infty}{\rm d}(\Delta x)p_m(\Delta x)\cos\left(mq\Delta x\right)$

where $p_m(\Delta x)$ is the probability density function for the separation $\Delta x$ of a pair of planes, $m$ lattice spacings apart. For the separation of neighbouring planes we assume for simplicity that the fluctuations around the mean neighbour spacing of a are Gaussian, i.e., that

$p_1(\Delta x)=\frac{1}{\left(2\pi\sigma_2^2\right)^{1/2}} \exp\left[-\left(\Delta x-a\right)^2/(2\sigma_2^2)\right]$

and we also assume that the fluctuations between a plane and its neighbour, and between this neighbour and the next plane, are independent. Then $p_2(\Delta x)$ is just the convolution of two $p_1(\Delta x)$s, etc. As the convolution of two Gaussians is just another Gaussian, we have that

$p_m(\Delta x)=\frac{1}{\left(2\pi m\sigma_2^2\right)^{1/2}} \exp\left[-\left(\Delta x-ma\right)^2/(2m\sigma_2^2)\right]$

The sum in $S(q)$ is then just a sum of Fourier Transforms of Gaussians, and so

$S(q)=1+2\sum_{m=1}^{\infty}r^m \cos\left(mqa\right)$

for $r=\exp[-q^2\sigma_2^2/2]$. The sum is just the real part of the sum $\sum_{m=1}^{\infty} [r\exp(iqa)]^m$ and so the structure factor of the infinite but disordered crystal is

$S(q)=\frac{1-r^2}{1+r^2-2r\cos(qa)}$

This has peaks at maxima $q_p=2n\pi/a$, where $\cos(q_Pa)=1$. These peaks have heights

$S(q_P)=\frac{1+r}{1-r}\approx\frac{4}{q_P^2\sigma_2^2}=\frac{a^2}{n^2\pi^2\sigma_2^2}$

i.e., the height of successive peaks drop off as the order of the peak (and so $q$) squared. Unlike finite-size effects that broaden peaks but do not decrease their height, disorder lowers peak heights. Note that here we assuming that the disorder is relatively weak, so that we still have relatively well defined peaks. This is the limit $q\sigma_2\ll 1$, where $r\simeq 1-q^2\sigma_2^2/2$. In this limit, near a peak we can approximate $\cos(qa)\simeq 1-(\Delta q)^2a^2/2$, with$\Delta q=q-q_P$ and obtain

$S(q)\approx\frac{S(q_P)} {1+\frac{r}{(1-r)^2}\Delta q^2a^2} \approx \frac{S(q_P)}{1+\frac{\Delta q^2}{[q_P^2\sigma_2^2/2a]^2}}$

which is a Lorentzian or Cauchy function, of FWHM $q_P^2\sigma_2^2/a=4\pi^2n^2(\sigma_2/a)^2/a$, i.e., the FWHM increases as the square of the order of peak, and so as the square of the wavevector $q$ at the peak. Finally, the product of the peak height and the FWHM is constant and equals $4/a$, in the $q\sigma_2\ll 1$ limit. For the first few peaks where $n$ is not large, this is just the $\sigma_2/a\ll 1$ limit.

Thus finite-size and this type of disorder both cause peak broadening, but there are qualitative differences. Finite-size effects broadens all peaks equally, and does not affect peak heights, while this type of disorder both reduces peak heights and broadens peaks by an amount that increases as $n^2$. This, in principle, allows the two effects to be distinguished. Also, it means that the Scherrer equation is best applied to the first peak, as disorder of this type affects the first peak the least.

=== Coherence length ===
Within this model the degree of correlation between a pair of planes decreases as the distance between these planes increases, i.e., a pair of planes 10 planes apart have positions that are more weakly correlated than a pair of planes that are nearest neighbours. The correlation is given by $p_m$, for a pair of planes m planes apart. For sufficiently large m the pair of planes are essentially uncorrelated, in the sense that the uncertainty in their relative positions is so large that it is comparable to the lattice spacing, a. This defines a correlation length, $\lambda$, defined as the separation when the width of $p_m$, which is $m^{1/2}\sigma_2$ equals a. This gives

$\lambda=\frac{a^3}{\sigma_2^2}$

which is in effect an order-of-magnitude estimate for the size of domains of coherent crystalline lattices. Note that the FWHM of the first peak scales as $\sigma_2^2/a^3$, so the coherence length is approximately 1/FWHM for the first peak.
