= The Catcher Was a Spy (film) =

2018 American film by Ben Lewin

- Theatrical release poster
- Directed by: Ben Lewin
- Screenplay by: Robert Rodat
- Based on: The Catcher Was a Spy by Nicholas Dawidoff
- Produced by: Kevin Scott Frakes; Tatiana Kelly; Buddy Patrick; Jim Young
- Starring: Paul Rudd; Mark Strong; Sienna Miller; Jeff Daniels; Tom Wilkinson; Giancarlo Giannini; Hiroyuki Sanada; Guy Pearce; Paul Giamatti
- Cinematography: Andrij Parekh
- Edited by: Mark Yoshikawa
- Music by: Howard Shore
- Production companies: Animus Films; PalmStar Media; Serena Films; Windy Hill Productions
- Distributed by: IFC Films
- Release dates: January 19, 2018 (Sundance); June 22, 2018 (United States)
- Running time: 94 minutes
- Country: United States
- Language: English
- Box office: $953,953

The Catcher Was a Spy is a 2018 American war film directed by Ben Lewin and written by Robert Rodat, based on the 1994 book by Nicholas Dawidoff. It stars Paul Rudd as Moe Berg, a former baseball player who joined the war effort during World War II and participated in espionage for the U.S. Government. Mark Strong, Sienna Miller, Jeff Daniels, Tom Wilkinson, Giancarlo Giannini, Hiroyuki Sanada, Guy Pearce, and Paul Giamatti also star. The film premiered at the 2018 Sundance Film Festival, and was released on June 22, 2018, by IFC Films.

== Premise ==
Moe Berg, a 15-year baseball veteran, joins the war effort as a spy to beat Nazi Germany in the race to build the first atomic bomb.

In 1936, Berg is playing for the Boston Red Sox 3 years before the end of a long and undistinguished pro career. On a goodwill baseball exhibition tour of Japan, Berg sneaks onto the roof of a Tokyo hospital to covertly film Tokyo's harbor and Navy shipyards. The Office of Strategic Services Chief to whom he presents the film is impressed by Berg’s enterprise, as well as the extensive language skills that Berg has picked up at Princeton and elsewhere, and Berg is hired in 1943.

Werner Heisenberg, who won the Nobel Prize in 1932 for pioneering quantum physics, is now in charge of the Nazis’ attempts to create an atom bomb. If he succeeds, the Germans could win the war. Berg is smuggled into Italy and then Switzerland, with the task to discover if Heisenberg is anywhere near that goal. If so, it will fall to Berg to assassinate the brilliant physicist.

== Cast ==
- Paul Rudd as Moe Berg
- Mark Strong as Werner Heisenberg
- Sienna Miller as Estella Huni
- Jeff Daniels as Bill Donovan
- Tom Wilkinson as Paul Scherrer
- Giancarlo Giannini as Professor Edoardo Amaldi
- Hiroyuki Sanada as Kawabata
- Guy Pearce as Robert Furman
- Ben Miles as Jerry Fredericks
- Paul Giamatti as Samuel Goudsmit
- Connie Nielsen as Koranda
- Shea Whigham as Joe Cronin
- William Hope as John Kieran
- Bobby Schofield as Bill Dalton
- John Schwab as Lefty Grove
- Pierfrancesco Favino as Martinuzzi
- James McVan as Lou Gehrig
- Demetri Goritsas as Clifton Fadiman
- Jordan Long as Babe Ruth
- Gabriel Andrews as British Colonel
- Peter Hosking as Boseley

== Production ==
The project was announced on April 26, 2016, with Ben Lewin hired to direct, Robert Rodat tasked with adapting the biography, and Paul Rudd cast as Moe Berg; PalmStar Media would produce.

In February 2017, Guy Pearce, Jeff Daniels, Paul Giamatti, Sienna Miller, and Giancarlo Giannini were added to the cast. Filming began on February 13, with filming locations being Prague and Boston. Hiroyuki Sanada was cast in March, with Tom Wilkinson, Connie Nielsen, and Shea Whigham joining in April. Principal photography lasted for 30 days.

== Release ==
The film was set to have its world premiere at the Toronto International Film Festival in September 2017, but the film was pulled out after it was realized that post-production was not completed in time. It premiered at the 2018 Sundance Film Festival. IFC Films acquired the film and set a release date of June 22, 2018.

== Reception ==
=== Box office ===
The Catcher Was a Spy made $114,771 from 49 theaters in its opening weekend, for an average of $2,459 per venue.

=== Critical response ===
On review aggregator Rotten Tomatoes, the film holds an approval rating of 32% based on 75 reviews, with an average rating of 5.2/10. The website's critical consensus reads, "The Catcher Was a Spy loses sight of the most interesting elements of its fact-based story, dropping the ball and leaving likable lead Paul Rudd stranded." On Metacritic, the film has a weighted average score of 49 out of 100, based on 27 critics, indicating "mixed or average reviews".
