= Debye–Waller factor =

Concept in crystallography

The Debye–Waller factor (DWF), named after Peter Debye and Ivar Waller, is used in condensed matter physics to describe the attenuation of x-ray scattering or coherent neutron scattering caused by thermal motion. It is also called the temperature factor. Often, "Debye–Waller factor" is used as a generic term that comprises the Lamb–Mössbauer factor of incoherent neutron scattering and Mössbauer spectroscopy.

The DWF depends on the scattering vector q. For a given q, DWF(q)$^2$ gives the fraction of elastic scattering; 1 – DWF(q)$^2$ correspondingly gives the fraction of inelastic scattering (strictly speaking, this probability interpretation is not true in general). In diffraction studies, only the elastic scattering is useful; in crystals, it gives rise to distinct Bragg reflection peaks. Inelastic scattering events are undesirable as they cause a diffuse background — unless the energies of scattered particles are analysed, in which case they carry valuable information (for instance in inelastic neutron scattering or electron energy loss spectroscopy).

The basic expression for the DWF is given by

$$\text{DWF} = \left\langle \exp\left(i \mathbf{q}\cdot \mathbf{u}\right) \right\rangle$$

where u is the displacement of a scattering center, and $\langle \ldots \rangle$ denotes either thermal or time averaging.

Assuming harmonicity of the scattering centers in the material under study, the Boltzmann distribution implies that $\mathbf{q}\cdot \mathbf{u}$ is normally distributed with zero mean. Then, using for example the expression of the corresponding characteristic function, the DWF takes the form

$$\text{DWF} = \exp\left( -\langle [\mathbf{q}\cdot \mathbf{u}]^2 \rangle/2 \right)$$

Note that although the above reasoning is classical, the same holds in quantum mechanics.

Assuming also isotropy of the harmonic potential, one may write

$$\text{DWF} = \exp\left( -q^2 \langle u^2 \rangle/2 \right)$$

where q, u are the magnitudes (or absolute values) of the vectors q, u respectively, and $\langle u^2 \rangle$ is the mean squared displacement. In crystallographic publications, values of $U$ are often given where $U = \langle u^2 \rangle$. Note that if the incident wave has wavelength $\lambda$, and it is elastically scattered by an angle of $2\theta$, then

$$q = \frac{4\pi \sin(\theta)}{\lambda}$$

In the context of protein structures, the term B-factor is used. The B-factor is defined as

$B = {8\pi^2} \langle u^2 \rangle$

It is measured in units of Å^{2}. The B-factors can be taken as indicating the relative vibrational motion of different parts of the structure. Atoms with low B-factors belong to a part of the structure that is well ordered. Atoms with large B-factors generally belong to part of the structure that is very flexible. Each ATOM record (PDB file format) of a crystal structure deposited with the Protein Data Bank contains a B-factor for that atom.

== Derivation ==
=== Introduction ===
Scattering experiments are a common method for learning about crystals. Such experiments typically involve a probe (e.g. X-rays or neutrons) and a crystalline solid. A well-characterized probe propagating towards the crystal may interact and scatter away in a particular manner. Mathematical expressions relating the scattering pattern, properties of the probe, properties of the experimental apparatus, and properties of the crystal then allow one to derive desired features of the crystalline sample.

The following derivation is based on chapter 14 of Simon's The Oxford Solid State Basics and on the report Atomic Displacement Parameter Nomenclature by Trueblood et al. (available under #External links). It is recommended to consult these sources for a more explicit discussion. Background on the quantum mechanics involved may be found in Sakurai and Napolitano's Modern Quantum Mechanics.

Scattering experiments often consist of a particle with initial crystal momentum $\vec{k}$ incident on a solid. The particle passes through a potential distributed in space, $V(\vec{r})$, and exits with crystal momentum $\vec{k}'$. This situation is described by Fermi's golden rule, which gives the probability of transition per unit time, $\Gamma(\vec{k}',\vec{k})$, to the energy eigenstate $E_{\vec{k}'}$ from the energy eigenstate $E_{\vec{k}}$ due to the weak perturbation caused by our potential $V(\vec{r})$.

$\Gamma(\vec{k}',\vec{k})=\frac{2\pi}{\hbar} \left \vert \langle \vec{k}'| V | \vec{k} \rangle \right \vert ^2 \delta(E_{\vec{k}'}-E_{\vec{k}})$. (1)

By inserting a complete set of position states, then utilizing the plane-wave expression relating position and momentum, we find that the matrix element is simply a Fourier transform of the potential.

$\langle \vec{k}'| V | \vec{k} \rangle = \frac{1}{L^3}\int d^3\vec{r} V(\vec{r}) e^{-i(\vec{k}'-\vec{k})\cdot\vec{r}}$ . (2)

Above, the length of the sample is denoted by $L$. We now assume that our solid is a periodic crystal with each unit cell labeled by a lattice position vector $\vec{R}$ . Position within a unit cell is given by a vector $\vec{x}$ such that the overall position in the crystal may be expressed as $\vec{r} = \vec{R} + \vec{x}$. Because of the translational invariance of our unit cells, the potential distribution of every cell is identical and $V(\vec{x}) = V(\vec{x} + \vec{R})$.

$\langle \vec{k}'| V | \vec{k} \rangle = \left [ \frac{1}{L^3} \sum_{\vec{R}} e^{-i(\vec{k}'-\vec{k})\cdot\vec{R}} \right ] \left [ \int_{unit-cell} d^3\vec{x} V(\vec{x}) e^{-i(\vec{k}'-\vec{k})\cdot\vec{x}} \right ]$ . (3)

=== Laue equation ===
According to the Poisson summation formula:

$\sum_{\vec{R}} e^{-i \vec{\kappa} \cdot\vec{R}} = \frac{(2 \pi)^D}{v} \sum_{\vec{q}} \delta (\vec{\kappa} - \vec{q})$ . (4)

$\vec{q}$ is a reciprocal lattice vector of the periodic potential and $v$ is the volume of its unit cell. By comparison of (3) and (4), we find that the Laue equation must be satisfied for scattering to occur:

$\vec{k}'-\vec{k} = \vec{q}$. (5)

(5) is a statement of the conservation of crystal momentum. Particles scattered in a crystal experience a change in wave vector equal to a reciprocal lattice vector of the crystal. When they do, the contribution to the matrix element is simply a finite constant. Thus, we find an important link between scattered particles and the scattering crystal. The Laue condition, which states that crystal momentum must be conserved, is equivalent to the Bragg condition $m \lambda = 2 d \sin \theta$, which demands constructive interference for scattered particles. Now that we see how the first factor of (3) determines whether or not incident particles are scattered, we consider how the second factor influences scattering.

=== Structure factor ===
The second term on the right hand side of (3) is the structure factor.

$F(\vec{q}) = \int_{unit-cell} d^3\vec{x} V(\vec{x}) e^{-i \vec{q} \cdot \vec{x}}$ (6)

For a given reciprocal lattice vector (corresponding to a family of lattice planes labeled by Miller indices $(hkl)$), the intensity of scattered particles is proportional to the square of the structure factor.

$I_{(hkl)} \propto |F_{(hkl)}|^2$ . (7)

Buried in (6) are detailed aspects of the crystal structure that are worth distinguishing and discussing.

=== Debye–Waller factor ===
Consideration of the structure factor (and our assumption about translational invariance) is complicated by the fact that atoms in the crystal may be displaced from their respective lattice sites. Taking the scattering potential to be proportional to the density of scattering matter, we rewrite the structure factor.

$F(\vec{q}) = \int d^3\vec{x} \langle \rho(\vec{x}) \rangle e^{- i \vec{q} \cdot \vec{x}}$ . (8)

The integral from here onwards is understood to be taken over the unit cell. $\rho(\vec{x})$ is the density of scattering matter. The angle brackets indicate a temporal average of each unit cell followed by a spatial average over every unit cell. We further assume that each atom is displaced independently of the other atoms.

$\langle \rho(\vec{x}) \rangle \simeq \sum_{k=1}^N n_k \int d^3\vec{x}_k \rho_k(\vec{x}-\vec{x}_k) p_k(\vec{x}_k-\vec{x}_{k 0})$ . (9)

The number of atoms in the unit cell is $N$ and the occupancy factor for atom $k$ is $n_k$. $\vec{x}$ represents the point in the unit cell for which we would like to know the density of scattering matter. $\rho_k(\vec{x}-\vec{x}_k)$ is the density of scattering matter from atom $k$ at a position separated from the nuclear position $\vec{x}_k$ by a vector $\vec{x}-\vec{x}_k$. $p_k(\vec{x}_k-\vec{x}_{k 0})$ is the probability density function for displacement. $\vec{x}_{k 0}$ is the reference lattice site from which atom $k$ may be displaced to a new position $\vec{x}_{k}$. If $\rho_k$ is symmetrical enough (e.g. spherically symmetrical), $\vec{x}_{k 0}$ is simply the mean nuclear position. When considering X-ray scattering, the scattering matter density consists of electron density around the nucleus. For neutron scattering, we have $\delta$-functions weighted by a scattering length $b_k$ for the respective nucleus (see Fermi pseudopotential). Note that in the above discussion, we assumed the atoms were not deformable. With this in mind, (9) may be plugged into expression (8) for the structure factor.

$F(\vec{q}) \simeq \sum_{k=1}^N n_k F_k(\vec{q})$; $F_k(\vec{q}) = \int d^3\vec{x} \left [ \int d^3\vec{r}_k \rho_k(\vec{x}-\vec{x}_k) p_k(\vec{x}_k-\vec{x}_{k 0}) \right ] e^{-i \vec{q} \cdot \vec{x}}$ . (10)

Now we see the overall structure factor may be represented as a weighted sum of structure factors $F_k(\vec{q})$ corresponding to each atom. Set the displacement between the location in space for which we would like to know the scattering density and the reference position for the nucleus equal to a new variable $\vec{t} = \vec{x} - \vec{x}_{k 0}$. Do the same for the displacement between the displaced and reference nuclear positions $\vec{u} = \vec{x}_k - \vec{x}_{k 0}$. Substitute into (10).

$F_k(\vec{q}) = \left \{ \int d^3\vec{t} \left [ \int d^3\vec{u} \rho_k(\vec{t}-\vec{u}) p_k(\vec{u}) \right ] e^{-i \vec{q} \cdot \vec{t}} \right \} e^{-i \vec{q} \cdot \vec{x}_{k 0}}$ . (11)

Within the square brackets of (11), we convolve the density of scattering matter of atom $k$ with the probability density function for some nuclear displacement. Then, in the curly brackets, we Fourier transform the resulting convolution. The final step is to multiply by a phase depending on the reference (e.g. mean) position of atom $k$. But, according to the convolution theorem, Fourier transforming a convolution is the same as multiplying the two Fourier transformed functions. Set the displacement between the location in space for which we would like to know the scattering density and the position for the nucleus equal to a new variable $\vec{v} = \vec{x} - \vec{x}_{k} = \vec{t} - \vec{u}$.

$F_k(\vec{q}) = \left [ \int d^3\vec{v} \rho_k(\vec{v}) e^{-i \vec{q} \cdot \vec{v}} \right ] \left [ \int d^3\vec{u} p_k(\vec{u}) e^{-i \vec{q} \cdot \vec{u}} \right ] e^{-i \vec{q} \cdot \vec{x}_{k 0}}$ . (12)

Substitute (12) into (10).

$F(\vec{q}) = \sum_{k=1}^N n_k \left [ \int d^3\vec{v} \rho_k(\vec{v}) e^{-i \vec{q} \cdot \vec{v}} \right ] \left [ \int d^3\vec{u} p_k(\vec{u}) e^{-i \vec{q} \cdot \vec{u}} \right ] e^{-i \vec{q} \cdot \vec{x}_{k 0}}$ . (13)

That is:

$F(\vec{q}) = \sum_{k=1}^N n_k f_k(\vec{q}) T_k(\vec{q}) e^{- i \vec{q} \cdot \vec{x}_{k 0}}$; $f_k(\vec{q}) = \int d^3 \vec{v} \rho_k(\vec{v}) e^{-i \vec{q} \cdot \vec{v}}$ , $T_k(\vec{q}) = \int d^3 \vec{u} p_k(\vec{u}) e^{-i \vec{q} \cdot \vec{u}}$ . (14)

$f_k(\vec{q})$ is the atomic form factor of the atom $k$; it determines how the distribution of scattering matter about the nuclear position influences scattering. $T_k(\vec{q})$ is the atomic Debye–Waller factor; it determines how the propensity for nuclear displacement from the reference lattice position influences scattering. The expression given for $\text{DWF}$ in the article's opening is different because of the decision to take the lattice or time average.

=== Anisotropic displacement parameter, U ===
A common simplification to (14) is the harmonic approximation, in which the probability density function is modeled as a Gaussian. Under this approximation, static displacive disorder is ignored and it is assumed that atomic displacements are determined entirely by motion (alternative models in which the Gaussian approximation is invalid have been considered elsewhere).

$p(\vec{u}) \equiv \sqrt{\frac{\mathrm{det}(\mathsf{U^{-1}})}{(2 \pi)^3}} e^{-\frac{1}{2} \vec{u}^\mathsf{T} \mathsf{U}^{-1} \vec{u}}$; $\vec{u} \equiv \sum_{j=1}^3 \Delta \xi^j a^j \vec{a}_j$; $\mathsf{U}^{j l} \equiv \langle \Delta \xi^j \Delta \xi^l \rangle$. (15)

We've dropped the atomic index. $\vec{a}_j$ belongs to the direct lattice while $\vec{a}^j$ would belong to the reciprocal lattice. By choosing the convenient dimensionless basis $a^j \vec{a}_j$, we guarantee that $\Delta \xi^j$ will have units of length and describe the displacement. The tensor $\mathsf{U}$ in (15) is the anisotropic displacement parameter. With dimension (length)$^2$, it is associated with mean square displacements. For the mean square displacement along unit vector $\hat{n}$, simply take $\hat{n}^\mathsf{T} \mathsf{U} \hat{n}$. Related schemes use the parameters $\beta$ or B rather than $\mathsf{U}$ (see to Trueblood et al. for a more complete discussion). Finally, we can find the relationship between the Debye–Waller factor and the anisotropic displacement parameter.

$T(\vec{q}) = \langle e^{-i \vec{q} \cdot \vec{u}} \rangle = e^{- \frac{1}{2} \langle (\vec{q} \cdot \vec{u})^2 \rangle} = e^{- \frac{1}{2} \sum_{j=1}^3 \sum_{l=1}^3 q_j a^j \langle \Delta \xi^j \Delta \xi^l \rangle a^l q_l} = e^{- \frac{1}{2} \sum_{j=1}^3 \sum_{l=1}^3 q_j a^j \mathsf{U}^{j l} a^l q_l}$. (16)

From equations (7) and (14), the Debye–Waller factor $T(\vec{q})$ contributes to the observed intensity of a diffraction experiment. And based on (16), we see that our anisotropic displacement factor $\mathsf{U}$ is responsible for determining $T(\vec{q})$. Additionally, (15) shows that $\mathsf{U}$ may be directly related to the probability density function $p$ for a nuclear displacement $\vec{u}$ from the mean position. As a result, it's possible to conduct a scattering experiment on a crystal, fit the resulting spectrum for the various atomic $\mathsf{U}$ values, and derive each atom's tendency for nuclear displacement from $p$.

== Applications ==
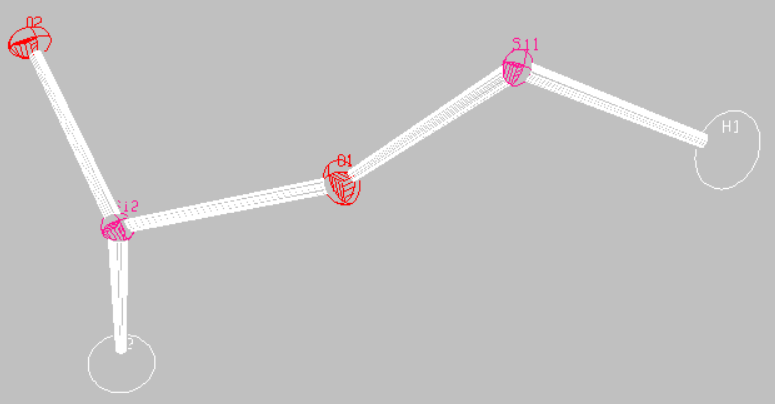
A 50% probability thermal ellipsoid model of H_{8}Si_{8}O_{12} constructed with ORTEP-3 from a .cif file on ICSD. Analysis following a diffraction experiment consists of fitting to the observed spectrum of scattered particles. U may be refined for each distinct atom during the process. For the above 50% probability model, $p(\vec{u}) = 0.5$ in equation (15). This defines a surface of nuclear displacements $\vec{u}$ for each U. Therefore, we expect each ellipsoid to vary depending on the type and environment of its atom. Note that surfaces represent nuclear displacements; thermal ellipsoid models should not be confused with other models (e.g. electron density, Van der Waals radii). Fewer than 28 atoms are displayed due to redundancy from symmetry considerations.

Anisotropic displacement parameters are often useful for visualizing matter. From (15), we may define ellipsoids of constant probability for which $\gamma = \vec{u}^\mathsf{T} \mathsf{U} \vec{u}$, where $\gamma$ is some constant. Such "vibration ellipsoids" have been used to illustrate crystal structures. Alternatively, mean square displacement surfaces along $\hat{n}$ may be defined by $\langle \vec{u}^2 \rangle_{\hat{n}} = \hat{n}^\mathsf{T} \mathsf{U} \hat{n}$. See the external links "Gallery of ray-traced ORTEP's", "2005 paper by Rowsell et al.", and "2009 paper by Korostelev and Noller" for more images. Anisotropic displacement parameters are also refined in programs (e.g. GSAS-II) to resolve scattering spectra during Rietveld refinement.

The B-factor can also be used to analyze radiation damage caused by the X-ray crystallography process. Localized radiation damage tends to show up as an increase in B-factor of particular "damaged" atoms as the atoms are allowed to move around due to radiation causing chemical changes. By comparing the B-factors of damage-prone atoms (aspartate/glutamate side-chain oxygen atoms) and non-damage-prone atoms, an estimate can be made about the degree of radiation damage present.
