= Nicholas Dawidoff =

American writer (born 1962)

Nicholas Dawidoff (born November 30, 1962) is an American writer.

Dawidoff was born in New York City, and grew up in New Haven, Connecticut, with his mother and sister.

His father's struggles with mental illness left him without a prominent male figure from an early age – a painful subject he explores in an article for The New Yorker called "My Father’s Troubles". He authored The Catcher Was a Spy, about the mysterious Moe Berg.

== Education and career ==
He graduated from the Hopkins School and attended Harvard University, graduating magna cum laude in 1985 with a degree in history and literature. He moved to New York to pursue a career as a writer and began working at Sports Illustrated, where he became a staff writer covering baseball and the environment.

In 1989, he was selected as a Henry Luce Scholar and spent a year in Bangkok, Thailand, writing for the Bangkok Post and teaching American Studies at Chulalongkorn University. In 1991, he left Sports Illustrated and began writing books. He is the author of six books and writes articles on a variety of topics, for periodicals like The New Yorker, the Ideas Section of The Boston Globe, The Atlantic and The New York Times Magazine.

== Recognitions ==
Dawidoff has also been a Guggenheim Fellow and a Civitella Ranieri Fellow, a Berlin Prize Fellow of the American Academy, an Art for Justice Fellow, and a fellow at the Levy Center for Biography at CUNY. He was the Anschutz Distinguished Fellow at Princeton University. He has also taught at Sarah Lawrence. He is a member of the honorary council board of directors of MacDowell, a member of the advisory board for the Wesleyan Center For Prison Education, a literary ambassador for Freedom Reads and a member of the board of directors at Hopkins School.

== Published books ==
- His first book, the best-selling The Catcher Was a Spy: The Mysterious Life of Moe Berg, published in June 1994 ISBN 0-679-76289-2, follows the strange life of third-string major league baseball catcher, lawyer, and OSS spy, Moe Berg. It was made into a film starring Paul Rudd and Paul Giamatti.
- In The Country of Country: A Journey to the Roots of American Music (1998), an effort to examine the culture with the same seriousness with which jazz and blues are studied, explores country music through its history, places, and performers. Dawidoff interviews and travels with great performers and songwriters like Johnny Cash, Merle Haggard, George Jones, and Kitty Wells, as well as relatives, friends and acquaintances of legends like Jimmie Rodgers, Patsy Cline and the original Carter Family. Condé Nast Traveler named it one of the greatest all-time works of travel literature.
- He edited The Library of America's Baseball: A Literary Anthology (March 2002), in which he compiled exceptional baseball writing.
- The Fly Swatter: A Portrait of an Exceptional Character (May 2002), is a memoir of his grandfather, the economist Alexander Gerschenkron. It was a finalist for the 2003 Pulitzer Prize in biography. A Seattle Times Book of the Year, the Chicago Tribune wrote, “It wouldn’t be an overstatement to say this loving memoir is the most fascinating in its class.”
- The Crowd Sounds Happy: A Story of Love, Madness and Baseball (May 2008) is a memoir of his experience growing up in New Haven and New York in the 1970s, his troubled family, and how baseball helps him find his place in the world. It won a Kenneth Johnson Book Award for an outstanding literary contribution to a better understanding of mental illness.
- Collision Low Crossers: A Year Inside the Turbulent World of NFL Football (November 2013) is an account of over a year spent with the New York Jets coaching staff as a way to understand how professional football works. It was called "Riveting" and "An instant classic" by The New York Times, was named to several 2013 best books lists, and was a finalist for a PEN America literary award.
- The Other Side of Prospect: A Story of Violence, Injustice, And The American City was praised on the front page of the Washington Post’s Sunday Book World as “a classic, tragic account of American incarceration…Dawidoff has written a great American book.” It was a New Yorker and Commonweal book of the year, won The American Bar Association’s book award (the Silver Gavel); won The American Society of Journalists and Authors nonfiction book award; was a finalist for the New York Public Library’s Helen Bernstein Book Award for excellence in journalism; won the Social Justice Award from NHS New Haven, and was selected as Yale Divinity School’s “All Community Book” for the year 2023-2024.
