= Merwin Jacobson =

American baseball player (1894–1978)

- Outfielder
- Born: March 7, 1894; New Britain, Connecticut, U.S.
- Died: January 13, 1978 (aged 83); Baltimore, Maryland, U.S.
- Batted: Left Threw: Left

MLB debut
- September 8, 1915, for the New York Giants

Last MLB appearance
- May 21, 1927, for the Brooklyn Robins

MLB statistics
- Batting average: .230
- Home runs: 0
- Runs batted in: 24
- Stats at Baseball Reference

Teams
- New York Giants (1915); Chicago Cubs (1916); Brooklyn Robins (1926–1927)

Merwin John William Jacobson (March 7, 1894 – January 13, 1978) was an American backup outfielder in Major League Baseball who played for three different teams between 1915 and 1927. Listed at 5 ft 11.5 in (1.82 m), 165 lb., Jacobson batted and threw left-handed. He was born in New Britain, Connecticut.

A decent outfielder with a hard throwing arm, Jacobson entered the majors in 1915 with the New York Giants, playing for them one year before joining the Chicago Cubs in 1916. From 1917 to 1925 he played with the Baltimore Orioles and Jersey City Skeeters of the International League. During the 1920 season, Jacobsen led the International League with a batting average of .404, 235 hits and 161 runs scored. He returned to the major leagues with the Brooklyn Robins in 1926 and 1927. His most productive season came in 1926 with Brooklyn, when he posted a .247 batting average with 23 RBI in a career-high 110 games.

In a four-season career, Jacobson hit .230 (76-for-331) with 47 runs and 24 RBI in 133 games, including nine doubles, two triples, seven stolen bases, and a .309 on-base percentage. He made 99 outfield appearances at center field (55), right (42) and left (2), and posted a collective .973 fielding percentage.

After his time with the Robins he never appeared again in the major leagues, but he continued to play minor league baseball until 1933.

Jacobson died in Baltimore, Maryland at age 83.

== Transactions ==
- During the 1916 season was sent by the Giants with Larry Doyle and Herb Hunter to the Cubs in exchange for Heinie Zimmerman and Mickey Doolan.
