= Laue equations =

Equations describing diffraction in a crystal lattice

Laue equation

In crystallography and solid state physics, the Laue equations relate incoming waves to outgoing waves in the process of elastic scattering, where the photon energy or light temporal frequency does not change upon scattering by a crystal lattice. They are named after physicist Max von Laue (1879–1960).

The Laue equations can be written as $\mathbf{\Delta k}= \mathbf{k}_{\mathrm{out}} - \mathbf{k}_{\mathrm{in}} = \mathbf{G}$ as the condition of elastic wave scattering by a crystal lattice, where $\mathbf{\Delta k}$ is the scattering vector, $\mathbf{k}_{\mathrm{in}}$, $\mathbf k_{\mathrm{out}}$ are incoming and outgoing wave vectors (to the crystal and from the crystal, by scattering), and $\mathbf{G}$ is a crystal reciprocal lattice vector. Due to elastic scattering $|\mathbf{k}_{\mathrm{out}}|^2=|\mathbf{k}_{\mathrm{in}}|^2$. The three vectors ($\mathbf{G}$, $\mathbf{k}_{\mathrm{out}}$, and $-\mathbf{k}_{\mathrm{in}}$) form an isosceles triangle if the equation is satisfied. If the scattering satisfies this equation, all the crystal lattice points scatter the incoming wave toward the scattering direction (the direction along $\mathbf k_{\mathrm{out}}$). If the equation is not satisfied, then for any scattering direction, only some lattice points scatter the incoming wave. (This physical interpretation of the equation is based on the assumption that scattering at a lattice point is made in a way that the scattering wave and the incoming wave have the same phase at the point.) It also can be seen as the conservation of momentum as $\hbar \mathbf{k}_{\mathrm{out}} = \hbar \mathbf{k}_{\mathrm{in}} + \hbar \mathbf{G}$ since $\mathbf{G}$ is the wave vector for a plane wave associated with parallel crystal lattice planes. (Wavefronts of the plane wave are coincident with these lattice planes.)

The equations are equivalent to Bragg's law; the Laue equations are vector equations while Bragg's law is in a form that is easier to solve, but these tell the same content.

== The Laue equations ==
Let $\mathbf{a}\, ,\mathbf{b}\, ,\mathbf{c}$ be primitive translation vectors (shortly called primitive vectors) of a crystal lattice $L$, where atoms are located at lattice points described by $\mathbf x = p\,\mathbf a+q\,\mathbf b+r\,\mathbf c$ with $p$, $q$, and $r$ as any integers. (So $\mathbf x$ indicating each lattice point is an integer linear combination of the primitive vectors.)

Let $\mathbf{k}_{\mathrm{in}}$ be the wave vector of an incoming (incident) beam or wave toward the crystal lattice $L$, and let $\mathbf k_{\mathrm{out}}$ be the wave vector of an outgoing (diffracted) beam or wave from $L$. Then the vector $\mathbf k_{\mathrm{out}} - \mathbf k_{\mathrm{in}} = \mathbf{\Delta k}$, called the scattering vector or transferred wave vector, measures the difference between the incoming and outgoing wave vectors.

The three conditions that the scattering vector $\mathbf{\Delta k}$ must satisfy, called the Laue equations, are the following:

$$\mathbf{\Delta k}\cdot \mathbf{a} =2\pi h$$
$$\mathbf{\Delta k}\cdot \mathbf{b} =2\pi k$$
$$\mathbf{\Delta k}\cdot \mathbf{c} =2\pi l$$

where numbers $h, k, l$ are integer numbers. Each choice of integers $(h,k,l)$, called Miller indices, determines a scattering vector $\mathbf{\Delta k}$. Hence there are infinitely many scattering vectors that satisfy the Laue equations as there are infinitely many choices of Miller indices $(h,k,l)$. Allowed scattering vectors $\mathbf{\Delta k}$ form a lattice $L^*$, called the reciprocal lattice of the crystal lattice $L$, as each $\mathbf{\Delta k}$ indicates a point of $L^*$. (This is the meaning of the Laue equations as shown below.) This condition allows a single incident beam to be diffracted in infinitely many directions. However, the beams corresponding to high Miller indices are very weak and can't be observed. These equations are enough to find a basis of the reciprocal lattice (since each observed $\mathbf{\Delta k}$ indicates a point of the reciprocal lattice of the crystal under the measurement), from which the crystal lattice can be determined. This is the principle of x-ray crystallography.

== Mathematical derivation ==
For an incident plane wave at a single frequency $\displaystyle f$ (and the angular frequency $\displaystyle \omega =2\pi f$) on a crystal, the diffracted waves from the crystal can be thought as the sum of outgoing plane waves from the crystal. (In fact, any wave can be represented as the sum of plane waves, see Fourier Optics.) The incident wave and one of plane waves of the diffracted wave are represented as

$$\displaystyle f_{\mathrm {in} }(t,\mathbf {x} )=A_{\mathrm {in} }\cos(\omega \,t-\mathbf {k} _{\mathrm {in} }\cdot \mathbf {x} +\varphi _{\mathrm {in} }),$$
$$\displaystyle f_{\mathrm {out} }(t,\mathbf {x} )=A_{\mathrm {out} }\cos(\omega \,t-\mathbf {k} _{\mathrm {out} }\cdot \mathbf {x}+\varphi _{\mathrm {out} }),$$

where $\displaystyle \mathbf {k} _{\mathrm {in} }$ and $\displaystyle \mathbf {k} _{\mathrm {out} }$ are wave vectors for the incident and outgoing plane waves, $\displaystyle \mathbf {x}$ is the position vector, and $\displaystyle t$ is a scalar representing time, and $\varphi _{\mathrm {in} }$ and $\varphi _{\mathrm {out} }$ are initial phases for the waves. For simplicity we take waves as scalars here, even though the main case of interest is an electromagnetic field, which is a vector. We can think these scalar waves as components of vector waves along a certain axis (x, y, or z axis) of the Cartesian coordinate system.

The incident and diffracted waves propagate through space independently, except at points of the lattice $L$ of the crystal, where they resonate with the oscillators, so the phases of these waves must coincide. At each point $\mathbf x = p\,\mathbf a+q\,\mathbf b+r\,\mathbf c$ of the lattice $L$, we have

$$\cos (\omega\,t-\mathbf k_{\mathrm{in}}\cdot\mathbf x+\varphi _{\mathrm {in} }) = \cos (\omega\,t-\mathbf k_{\mathrm{out}}\cdot\mathbf x+\varphi _{\mathrm {out} }),$$

or equivalently, we must have

$$\omega\,t-\mathbf k_{\mathrm{in}}\cdot\mathbf x + \varphi _{\mathrm {in} }= \omega\,t-\mathbf k_{\mathrm{out}}\cdot\mathbf x + \varphi _{\mathrm {out} } + 2\pi n,$$

for some integer $n$, that depends on the point $\mathbf x$. Since this equation holds at $\mathbf x=0$, $\varphi _{\mathrm {in} } = \varphi _{\mathrm {out} }+2\pi n'$ at some integer $n'$. So

$$\omega\,t-\mathbf k_{\mathrm{in}}\cdot\mathbf x = \omega\,t-\mathbf k_{\mathrm{out}}\cdot\mathbf x + 2\pi n.$$

(We still use $n$ instead of $(n-n')$ since both the notations essentially indicate some integer.) By rearranging terms, we get

$$\mathbf{\Delta k}\cdot \mathbf x = (\mathbf k_{\mathrm{out}}-\mathbf k_{\mathrm{in}})\cdot \mathbf x = 2\pi n.$$

Now, it is enough to check that this condition is satisfied at the primitive vectors $\mathbf a,\mathbf b,\mathbf c$ (which is exactly what the Laue equations say), because, at any lattice point $\mathbf x = p\,\mathbf a+q\,\mathbf b+r\,\mathbf c$, we have

$$\mathbf{\Delta k} \cdot \mathbf x
= \mathbf{\Delta k}\cdot (p\,\mathbf a+q\,\mathbf b+r\,\mathbf c)
= p(\mathbf{\Delta k}\cdot \mathbf a) + q(\mathbf{\Delta k}\cdot \mathbf b) + r(\mathbf{\Delta k}\cdot \mathbf c)
= p\,(2\pi h) + q\,(2\pi k) + r\,(2\pi l)
= 2\pi(ph+qk+rl)=2\pi n,$$

where $n$ is the integer $ph+qk+rl$. The claim that each parenthesis, e.g. $(\mathbf{\Delta k} \cdot \mathbf{a})$, is to be a multiple of $2\pi$ (that is each Laue equation) is justified since otherwise $p(\mathbf{\Delta k}\cdot \mathbf a) + q(\mathbf{\Delta k}\cdot \mathbf b) + r(\mathbf{\Delta k}\cdot \mathbf c) = 2\pi n$ does not hold for any arbitrary integers $p, q, r$.

This ensures that if the Laue equations are satisfied, then the incoming and outgoing (diffracted) wave have the same phase at each point of the crystal lattice, so the oscillations of atoms of the crystal, that follows the incoming wave, can at the same time generate the outgoing wave at the same phase of the incoming wave.

== Relation to reciprocal lattices and Bragg's Law ==
If $\mathbf{G}=h \mathbf{A}+k \mathbf{B}+l \mathbf{C}$ with $h$, $k$, $l$ as integers represents the reciprocal lattice for a crystal lattice $L$ (defined by $\mathbf x = p\,\mathbf a+q\,\mathbf b+r\,\mathbf c$) in real space, we know that $\mathbf{G}\cdot \mathbf{x} = \mathbf{G} \cdot (p \mathbf{a}+q \mathbf{b}+r \mathbf{c})= 2\pi(hp+kq+lr) = 2\pi n$ with an integer $n$ due to the known orthogonality between primitive vectors for the reciprocal lattice and those for the crystal lattice. (We use the physical, not crystallographer's, definition for reciprocal lattice vectors which gives the factor of $2\pi$.) But notice that this is nothing but the Laue equations. Hence we identify $\mathbf{\Delta k}= \mathbf{k}_{\mathrm{out}} - \mathbf{k}_{\mathrm{in}} = \mathbf{G}$, means that allowed scattering vectors $\mathbf{\Delta k}= \mathbf{k}_{\mathrm{out}} - \mathbf{k}_{\mathrm{in}}$ are those equal to reciprocal lattice vectors $\mathbf{G}$ for a crystal in diffraction, and this is the meaning of the Laue equations. This fact is sometimes called the Laue condition. In this sense, diffraction patterns are a way to experimentally measure the reciprocal lattice for a crystal lattice.

The Laue condition can be rewritten as the following.

𝐆=𝐤out−𝐤in→|𝐤in|2=|𝐤out−𝐆|2→|𝐤in|2=|𝐤out|2−2𝐤out⋅𝐆+|𝐆|2.

Applying the elastic scattering condition $|\mathbf{k}_{\mathrm{out}}|^2=|\mathbf{k}_{\mathrm{in}}|^2$ (In other words, the incoming and diffracted waves are at the same (temporal) frequency. We can also say that the energy per photon does not change.)

To the above equation, we obtain

$$2\mathbf{k}_{\mathrm{out}}\cdot\mathbf{G}=|\mathbf{G}|^2,$$
$$2{{\mathbf{k}}_{\text{in}}}\cdot (-\mathbf{G})=|\mathbf{G}{{|}^{2}}.$$

The second equation is obtained from the first equation by using $\mathbf{k}_{\mathrm{out}} - \mathbf{k}_{\mathrm{in}} = \mathbf{G}$.

The result $2\mathbf{k}_{\mathrm{out}}\cdot\mathbf{G}=|\mathbf{G}|^2$ (also $2{{\mathbf{k}}_{\text{in}}}\cdot (-\mathbf{G})=|\mathbf{G}{{|}^{2}}$) is an equation for a plane (as the set of all points indicated by $\mathbf{k}_{\mathrm{out}}$ satisfying this equation) as its equivalent equation $\mathbf{G}\cdot (2{{\mathbf{k}}_{\text{out}}}-\mathbf{G})=0$ is a plane equation in geometry. Another equivalent equation, that may be easier to understand, is ${{\mathbf{k}}_{\text{out}}}\cdot \widehat{\mathbf{G}}=\frac{1}{2}\left| \mathbf{G} \right|$ (also $(-{{\mathbf{k}}_{\text{in}}})\cdot \widehat{\mathbf{G}}=\frac{1}{2}\left| \mathbf{G} \right|$). This indicates the plane that is perpendicular to the straight line between the reciprocal lattice origin $\mathbf{G}=0$ and $\mathbf{G}$ and located at the middle of the line. Such a plane is called Bragg plane. This plane can be understood since $\mathbf{G} = \mathbf{k}_{\mathrm{out}} - \mathbf{k}_{\mathrm{in}}$ for scattering to occur. (It is the Laue condition, equivalent to the Laue equations.) And, the elastic scattering $|\mathbf{k}_{\mathrm{out}}|^2=|\mathbf{k}_{\mathrm{in}}|^2$ has been assumed so $\mathbf{G}$, $\mathbf{k}_{\mathrm{out}}$, and $-\mathbf{k}_{\mathrm{in}}$ form a rhombus. Each $\mathbf{G}$ is by definition the wavevector of a plane wave in the Fourier series of a spatial function which periodicity follows the crystal lattice (e.g., the function representing the electronic density of the crystal), wavefronts of each plane wave in the Fourier series is perpendicular to the plane wave's wavevector $\mathbf{G}$, and these wavefronts are coincident with parallel crystal lattice planes. This means that X-rays are seemingly "reflected" off parallel crystal lattice planes perpendicular $\mathbf{G}$ at the same angle as their angle of approach to the crystal $\theta$ with respect to the lattice planes; in the elastic light (typically X-ray)-crystal scattering, parallel crystal lattice planes perpendicular to a reciprocal lattice vector $\mathbf{G}$ for the crystal lattice play as parallel mirrors for light which, together with $\mathbf{G}$, incoming (to the crystal) and outgoing (from the crystal by scattering) wavevectors forms a rhombus.

Since the angle between $\mathbf{k}_{\mathrm{out}}$ and $\mathbf{G}$ is $\pi/2 - \theta$, (Due to the mirror-like scattering, the angle between $\mathbf{k}_{\mathrm{in}}$ and $\mathbf{G}$ is also $\pi/2 - \theta$.) $\mathbf{k}_{\mathrm{out}}\cdot\mathbf{G} = |\mathbf{k}_{\mathrm{out}}||\mathbf{G}|\sin\theta$. Recall, $|\mathbf{k}_{\mathrm{out}}| = 2\pi/\lambda$ with $\lambda$ as the light (typically X-ray) wavelength, and $|\mathbf{G}| = \frac{2\pi}{d}n$ with $d$ as the distance between adjacent parallel crystal lattice planes and $n$ as an integer. With these, we now derive Bragg's law that is equivalent to the Laue equations (also called the Laue condition):

$$\begin{align} 2\mathbf{k}_{\mathrm{out}}\cdot\mathbf{G}=|\mathbf{G}|^2 \\
2|\mathbf{k}_{\mathrm{out}}||\mathbf{G}|\sin\theta =|\mathbf{G}|^2 \\
2 (2\pi/\lambda) (2\pi n/d) \sin\theta =(2\pi n/d )^2 \\
2d\sin\theta=n\lambda.
\end{align}$$
