= Moe Berg =

American baseball player and spy (1902–1972)

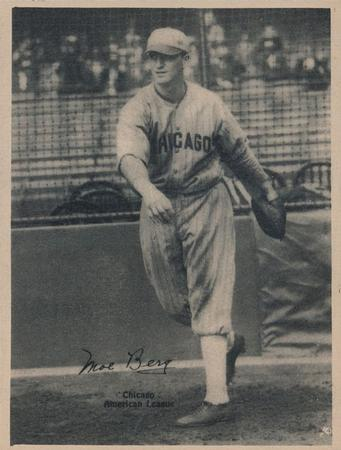
- 1929 Kashin baseball card of Berg while with the Chicago White Sox
- Catcher
- Born: May 3, 1902; New York City, U.S.
- Died: May 29, 1972 (aged 70); Belleville, New Jersey, U.S.
- Batted: Right Threw: Right

MLB debut
- June 27, 1923, for the Brooklyn Robins

Last MLB appearance
- September 1, 1939, for the Boston Red Sox

MLB statistics
- Batting average: .243
- Home runs: 6
- Runs batted in: 206
- Stats at Baseball Reference

Teams
- Brooklyn Robins (1923); Chicago White Sox (1926–1930); Cleveland Indians (1931); Washington Senators (1932–1934); Cleveland Indians (1934); Boston Red Sox (1935–1939)
Awards	Medal of Freedom
Espionage activity
Allegiance	United States
Agency	Office of Strategic Services
Service years	1943–1946

Morris Berg (May 3, 1902 – May 29, 1972) was an American professional baseball catcher and coach in Major League Baseball who later served as a spy for the Office of Strategic Services during World War II. He played 15 seasons in the major leagues, almost entirely for four American League teams, though he was never more than an average player and was better known for being "the brainiest guy in baseball." Casey Stengel once described Berg as "the strangest man ever to play baseball."

Berg was a graduate of Princeton University and Columbia Law School, spoke several languages, and regularly read ten newspapers a day. His reputation as an intellectual was fueled by his successful appearances as a contestant on the radio quiz show Information Please, in which he answered questions about the etymology of words and names from Greek and Latin, historical events in Europe and the Far East, and ongoing international conferences.

As a spy working for the government of the United States, Berg traveled to Yugoslavia to gather intelligence on resistance groups which the U.S. government was considering supporting. He was sent on a mission to Italy, where he interviewed various physicists concerning the German nuclear weapons program. After the war, Berg was occasionally employed by the Central Intelligence Agency, successor to the Office of Strategic Services.

== Early life and education ==
Berg was born as Moses Berg on May 3, 1902. According to baseball records and all official documents during his lifetime, his date of birth appeared as March 2, 1902. The correct date was discovered in 2019 by filmmaker Aviva Kempner, who found his birth certificate while doing research for her movie The Spy Behind Home Plate. Berg was the third and youngest child of Bernard Berg, a pharmacist who emigrated from Ukraine, and his wife Rose (née Tashker), a homemaker, both Jewish, who lived in the Harlem section of New York City, a few blocks from the Polo Grounds. When Berg was three and a half, he begged his mother to let him start school.

In 1906, Bernard Berg bought a pharmacy in West Newark and the family moved there. In 1910 the Berg family moved again, to the Roseville section of Newark. Roseville offered Bernard Berg everything he wanted in a neighborhood—good schools, middle-class residents, and few Jews.

Berg began playing baseball at the age of seven for the Roseville Methodist Episcopal Church baseball team under the pseudonym "Runt Wolfe". In 1918, at the age of 16, Berg graduated from Barringer High School. During his senior season, the Newark Star-Eagle selected a nine-man "dream team" for 1918 from the city's best prep and public high school baseball players, and Berg was named the team's third baseman. Barringer was the first of a series of institutions where Berg's religion made him unusual at the time. Most of the other students were East Side Italian Catholics or Protestants from the Forest Hill neighborhood. His father had wanted an environment with few Jews.

After graduating from Barringer, Berg enrolled in New York University. He spent two semesters there and also played baseball and basketball. In 1919 he transferred to Princeton University and never again referred to having attended NYU for a year, presenting himself exclusively as a Princeton man. Berg received a B.A., magna cum laude in modern languages. He studied seven languages: Latin, Greek, French, Spanish, Italian, German, and Sanskrit, studying with the philologist Harold H. Bender. His Jewish heritage and modest finances combined to keep him on the fringes of Princeton social life, where he never quite fit in.

During his freshman year, Berg played first base on an undefeated team. Beginning in his sophomore year, he was the starting shortstop. He was not a great hitter and was a slow baserunner, but he had a strong, accurate throwing arm and sound baseball instincts. In his senior season, he was captain of the team and had a .337 batting average, batting .611 against Princeton's arch-rivals, Harvard and Yale. Berg and Crossan Cooper, Princeton's second baseman, communicated plays in Latin when there was an opposing player on second base.

On June 26, 1923, Yale defeated Princeton 5–1 at Yankee Stadium to win the Big Three title. Berg had an outstanding day, getting two hits in four at bats (2–4) with a single and a double, and making several marvelous plays at shortstop. Both the New York Giants and the Brooklyn Robins (the team became known as the Brooklyn Dodgers starting in 1932) desired "Jewish blood" on their teams, to appeal to the large Jewish community in New York, and expressed interest in Berg. The Giants were especially interested, but they already had two shortstops, Dave "Beauty" Bancroft and Travis Jackson, who were future Hall of Famers. The Robins were a mediocre team, on which Berg would have a better chance to play. On June 27, 1923, Berg signed his first big league contract for $5,000 (equivalent to $71,000 in 2024) with the Robins.

== Major league career ==
=== Early career (1923–1925) ===
Berg's first game with the Robins was on June 27, 1923, against the Philadelphia Phillies at the Baker Bowl. Berg came in at the start of the seventh inning, replacing Ivy Olson at shortstop, when the Robins were winning 13–4. Berg handled five chances without an error, and caught a line drive to start a game-ending double play. He got a hit in two at bats, singling up the middle against Clarence Mitchell, and scoring a run. For the season, Berg batted .187 and made 21 errors in 47 games, his only National League experience.

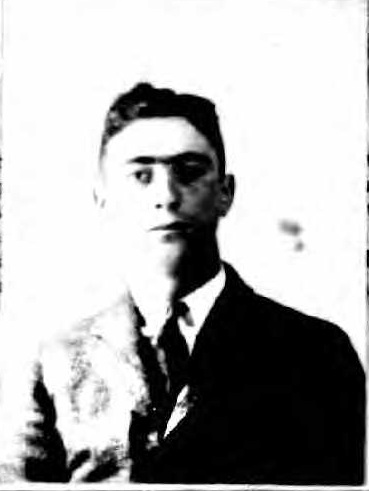
Passport photo of Morris "Moe" Berg, 1923

After the season ended, Berg took his first trip abroad, sailing from New York to Paris. He settled in the Latin Quarter in an apartment that overlooked the Sorbonne, where he enrolled in 32 different classes. In Paris he developed a habit he kept for the rest of his life: reading several newspapers daily. Until Berg finished reading a paper, he considered it "alive" and refused to let anyone else touch it. When he was finished with it, he would consider the paper "dead" and anybody could read it. In January 1924, instead of returning to New York and getting into shape for the upcoming baseball season, Berg toured Italy and Switzerland.

During spring training at the Robins facility in Clearwater, Florida, manager Wilbert Robinson could see that Berg's hitting had not improved, and optioned him to the Minneapolis Millers of the American Association. Berg did not take the demotion well and threatened to quit baseball, but by mid-April he reported to the Millers. Berg did very well once he became the Millers' regular third baseman, hitting close to .330, but in July his average plummeted and he was back on the bench. On August 19, 1924, Berg was lent to the Toledo Mud Hens, a poor team ravaged by injuries. Berg was inserted into the lineup at shortstop when Rabbit Helgeth refused to pay a $10 fine (equivalent to $145 in 2024) for poor play and was suspended. Major league scout Mike González sent a telegram to the Dodgers evaluating Berg with the curt, but now famous, line, "Good field, no hit." Berg finished the season with a .264 average.

By April 1925, Berg was starting to show promise as a hitter with the Reading Keystones of the International League. Because of his .311 batting average and 124 runs batted in, the Chicago White Sox exercised their option with Reading, paying $6,000 (equivalent to $85,000 in 2024) for him, and moved Berg up to the big leagues the following year.

=== Career as a catcher (1926–1934) ===
The 1926 season began with Berg informing the White Sox that he would skip spring training and the first two months of the season in order to complete his first year at Columbia Law School. He did not join the White Sox until May 28. Bill Hunnefield was signed by the White Sox to take Berg's place at shortstop and was having a very good year, batting over .300. Berg played in only 41 games, batting .221.

Berg returned to Columbia Law School after the season to continue studying for his law degree. Despite White Sox owner Charles Comiskey offering him more money to come to spring training, Berg declined, and informed the White Sox that he would report late for the 1927 season. Noel Dowling, a professor to whom Berg explained his situation, told Berg to take extra classes in the fall, and said that he would arrange with the dean a leave of absence from law school the following year, 1928.

Because he reported late, Berg spent the first three months of the season on the bench. In August, a series of injuries to catchers Ray Schalk, Harry McCurdy, and Buck Crouse left the White Sox in need of somebody to play the position. Schalk, the White Sox player/manager, selected Berg, who did a fine job filling in. Schalk arranged for former Philadelphia Phillies catcher Frank Bruggy to meet the team at their next game, against the New York Yankees. Bruggy was so fat that pitcher Ted Lyons refused to pitch to him. When Schalk asked Lyons whom he wanted to catch, the pitcher selected Berg.

In Berg's debut as a starting catcher, he had to worry not only about catching Lyons' knuckleball, but also about facing the Yankees' Murderers' Row lineup, which included Babe Ruth, Lou Gehrig, and Earle Combs. Lyons beat the Yankees 6–3, holding Ruth hitless. Berg made the defensive play of the game when he caught a poor throw from the outfield, spun and tagged out Joe Dugan at the plate. He caught eight more times during the final month and a half of the season.

To prepare for the 1928 season, Berg went to work at a lumber camp in New York's Adirondack Mountains three weeks before reporting to the White Sox spring training facility in Shreveport, Louisiana. The hard labor did wonders for him, and he reported to spring training on March 2, 1928, in excellent shape. By the end of the season, Berg had established himself as the starting catcher. In 1928, he led all AL catchers in caught-stealing percentage (60.9), was third in the AL in double plays by a catcher, with 8, and fifth in the American League in assists by a catcher, with 52. At the plate, he batted .246 with a career-high 16 doubles.

At law school, Berg failed Evidence and did not graduate with the class of 1929, but he passed the New York State bar exam. He repeated Evidence the following year, and on February 26, 1930, received his LL.B. On April 6, during an exhibition game against the Little Rock Travelers, his spikes caught in the soil as he tried to change direction, and he tore a knee ligament. In 1929, he was second in the American League in both double plays by a catcher (12) and assists by a catcher (86), caught the third-most attempted base stealers in the league (41), and was fourth in the league in caught-stealing percentage (47.7%). He had perhaps his best season at bat, hitting .287 with 47 RBIs.

He was back in the starting lineup on May 23, 1930, but was prevented from daily play because of his knee. He played in 20 games during the whole season and finished with a .115 batting average. During the winter, he took a job with the respected Wall Street law firm Satterlee and Canfield (now Satterlee, Stephens, Burke & Burke).

The Cleveland Indians picked him up on April 2, 1931, when Chicago put him on waivers, but he played in only 10 games, with 13 at-bats and only 1 hit for the entire season.

"Yeah, I know, and he can't hit in any of them."

— Dave Harris, Senators' outfielder, when told that Berg spoke seven languages

The Indians gave him his unconditional release in January 1932. With catchers hard to come by, Clark Griffith, owner of the Washington Senators, invited Berg to spring training in Biloxi, Mississippi. He made the team, playing in 75 games while not committing an error, and was second in the AL in double plays by a catcher, with 9, and in caught-stealing percentage, at 54.3%. When starting catcher Roy Spencer went down with an injury, Berg stepped in, throwing out 35 baserunners while batting .236.

=== First trip to Japan ===
Retired ballplayer Herb Hunter arranged for three players—Berg, Lefty O'Doul, and Ted Lyons—to go to Japan to teach baseball seminars at Japanese universities during the winter of 1932. On October 22, 1932, the group of three players began their circuit of Meiji, Waseda, Rikkyo, Todai (Tokyo Imperial), Hosei, and Keio universities, the members of the Tokyo Big6 Baseball League. When the other Americans returned to the United States after their coaching assignments were over, Berg stayed behind to explore Japan. He then went on to tour Manchuria, Shanghai, and Peking, China; Indochina, Siam, India, Egypt, and Berlin, Germany.

Despite his desire to return to Japan, Berg reported to the Senators training camp on February 26, 1933, in Biloxi. He played in 40 games during the season and batted a disappointing .185. The Senators won the pennant, but lost to the Giants in the World Series. Cliff Bolton, the Senators' starting catcher in 1933, demanded more money in 1934. When the Senators refused, he sat out and Berg got the starting job. On April 22, 1934, Berg made an error, his first fielding mistake since 1932. He had set an American League record of 117 consecutive games without an error. On July 25, the Senators gave Berg his unconditional release. He soon returned to the big leagues, however, after Cleveland Indians catcher Glenn Myatt broke his ankle on August 1. Indians manager Walter Johnson, who had managed Berg in 1932, offered Berg the reserve catching job. Berg played sporadically until Frankie Pytlak, Cleveland's starting catcher, injured himself, and Berg became the starting catcher.

=== Second trip to Japan ===
Herb Hunter arranged for a group of All-Stars, including Babe Ruth, Lou Gehrig, Earl Averill, Charlie Gehringer, Jimmie Foxx, and Lefty Gomez, to tour Japan playing exhibitions against a Japanese all-star team. Although Berg was a mediocre, third-string catcher, he was invited at the last minute to make the trip. Berg had contracted with Movietone News, a New York City newsreel production company, to film sights from his trip; he took a 16-mm Bell & Howell movie camera and a letter from the company attesting to this. When the team arrived in Japan, Berg gave a welcome speech in Japanese; he also was invited to address the legislature.

On November 29, 1934, while the rest of the team was playing in Omiya, Berg went to Saint Luke's Hospital in Tsukiji, ostensibly to visit the daughter of American Ambassador Joseph Grew. However, when Berg arrived he immediately went to the roof of the hospital, which was one of the tallest buildings in Tokyo, and filmed the city and port with his movie camera. In 1942, Berg provided American intelligence with his photos of the city in case they were of use to plan bombing raids. He never did see the ambassador's daughter. While Berg was in Japan, the Indians notified him of his unconditional release. Berg continued to travel to the Philippines, Korea, and Moscow in the Soviet Union.

=== Late career and coaching (1935–1941) ===
After his return to America, Berg was picked up by the Boston Red Sox. In his five seasons with the Red Sox, Berg averaged fewer than 30 games a season.

On February 21, 1939, Berg made the first of his three appearances on the radio quiz show Information, Please. Berg had a dazzling performance. Of his appearance, Baseball Commissioner Kenesaw Mountain Landis told him, "Berg, in just thirty minutes you did more for baseball than I've done the entire time I've been commissioner". On his third appearance, Clifton Fadiman, the moderator, started asking Berg what the latter thought were too many personal questions. Berg did not answer any of them and never appeared on the show again. Regular show guest and sportswriter John Kieran later said, "Moe was the most scholarly professional athlete (I) ever knew."

After his playing career ended, Berg worked as a Red Sox coach in 1940 and 1941. Berg punctuated his career in baseball with "Pitchers and Catchers," a widely admired valedictory essay on the meaning and playing of the game, published in the September 1941 issue of The Atlantic Monthly. A 2018 profile of Berg in The New York Times described the essay as "still one of the most insightful works ever penned about the game."

== Post-baseball career ==
=== Spying for the U.S. government ===
With the attack on Pearl Harbor by the Japanese on December 7, 1941, the United States was thrust into World War II. To do his part for the war effort, Berg accepted a position with Nelson Rockefeller's Office of the Coordinator of Inter-American Affairs (OIAA) on January 5, 1942. Nine days later, his father, Bernard, died. During the summer of 1942, Berg screened the footage he had shot of Tokyo Bay for intelligence officers of the United States military. (At one time it was thought his film may have helped Lieutenant Colonel Jimmy Doolittle plan his famous Doolittle Raid, but the raid was conducted well before the summer, on April 18, 1942.)

From August 1942 to February 1943, Berg was on assignment in the Caribbean and South America. His job was to monitor the health and physical fitness of the American troops stationed there. Berg, along with several other OIAA agents, left in June 1943 because they thought South America posed little threat to the United States. They wanted to be assigned to locations where their talents would be put to better use.

On August 2, 1943, Berg accepted a position with the Office of Strategic Services Special Operations Branch (SO) for a salary of $3,800 a year (equivalent to $55,000 in 2024). He was a paramilitary operations officer in the part of the OSS that developed into the present-day CIA Special Activities Division. In September, he was assigned to the OSS Secret Intelligence branch (SI), and given a spot on its Balkans desk. In this role, based in Washington, he remotely monitored the situation in Yugoslavia. He also helped prepare Slavic-Americans recruited by the OSS to go on dangerous parachute drop missions into Yugoslavia. His OSS code name was "Remus".

In late 1943, Berg was assigned to Project Larson, an OSS operation set up by OSS Chief of Special Projects John Shaheen. The stated purpose of the project was to kidnap Italian rocket and missile specialists in Italy and bring them to the U.S. Another project hidden within Larson was called Project AZUSA, which had the goal of interviewing Italian physicists to learn what they knew about Werner Heisenberg and Carl Friedrich von Weizsäcker. It was similar in scope and mission to the Alsos project.

During the mission, Berg had a heated run-in in Italy with Alsos chief Boris Pash, a controversial army officer who played a major role in the stripping of the security clearance of Robert Oppenheimer.

From May to mid-December 1944, Berg hopped around Europe, interviewing physicists and trying to convince several to leave Europe and work in the United States. In November, news about Heisenberg giving a lecture in Zürich reached the OSS. Berg was assigned to attend the lecture, which took place on December 18, and determine "if anything Heisenberg said convinced him the Germans were close to a bomb." If Berg concluded that the Germans were close, he had orders to shoot Heisenberg; Berg determined that the Germans were not close. (Note: William Tobey (January–February 2012), "Nuclear scientists as assassination targets", Bulletin of the Atomic Scientists, 68 (1): 63–64, Bibcode:2012BuAtS..68a..61T, doi:10.1177/0096340211433019, S2CID 145583391, citing) On orders direct from President Franklin Roosevelt, Berg persuaded Antonio Ferri, who had served as the head of the supersonic research program in Italy, to relocate to the United States and take part in supersonic aircraft development there. When Berg returned with Ferri, Roosevelt commented "I see that Moe Berg is still catching very well". During his time in Switzerland, Berg became close friends with physicist Paul Scherrer. Berg resigned from the OSS after the war, in January 1946.

=== After World War II ===
In 1951, Berg sought to convince the CIA (which replaced the OSS) to send him to the recently founded nation of Israel. "A Jew must do this", he wrote in his notebook. The CIA rejected Berg's request. But in 1952 Berg was hired by the CIA to use his old contacts from World War II to gather information about the Soviet atomic bomb project. For the $10,000 (equivalent to $95,000 in 2024) plus expenses that Berg received, the CIA received nothing. The CIA officer who spoke with Berg when he returned from Europe said that he was "flaky".

For the next 20 years, Berg had no regular employment. He may have been involved in helping arrange export agreements for aerospace firms, and may have acted as an informal private investigator. He relied on the generosity of friends and relatives who enjoyed his company. When they asked what he did for a living, he would reply by putting his finger to his lips, giving them the impression that he was still a spy. He maintained friendly relationships with sports journalists, sometimes traveling with them, sharing their hotel rooms, and taking advantage of the food prepared for them at games. He continued to attend scientific meetings and visit universities, as he had during WWII. A lifelong bachelor, he lived with his brother Samuel for 17 years. According to Samuel, Berg became moody and snappish after the war, and did not seem to care for much in life besides his books. Samuel finally grew fed up with the arrangement and asked Moe to leave, even having eviction papers drawn up. Berg next moved in with his sister Ethel in Belleville, New Jersey, where he resided for the rest of his life.

He received a handful of votes in Baseball Hall of Fame voting (four in 1958, and five in 1960). When he was criticized for "wasting" his intellectual talent on the sport he loved, Berg replied, "I'd rather be a ballplayer than a justice of the U.S. Supreme Court".

Berg received many requests to write his memoirs, but turned them down. He almost began work on them in 1960, but he quit after the co-writer assigned to work with him confused him with Moe Howard of the Three Stooges.

== Death ==
Berg died on May 29, 1972, at the age of 70, from injuries sustained in a fall at home. A nurse at the Belleville, New Jersey, hospital where he died recalled his final words as: "How did the Mets do today?" (They won.) By his request, his remains were cremated and the urn buried on Mount Scopus in Jerusalem.

== Legacy ==
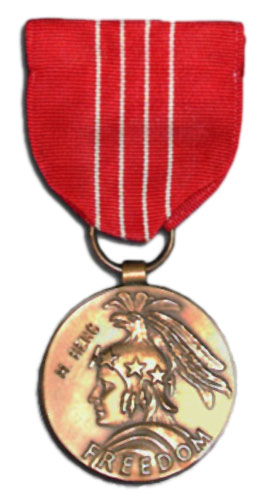
Berg turned down the Medal of Freedom during his lifetime; it was awarded after his death, with his sister accepting on his behalf.

- After the war, the OSS was disbanded. Berg was awarded the Medal of Freedom, the highest honor given to civilians during wartime, from President Harry S. Truman for his service. He declined to accept it without any public explanation. The citation read:

"Mr. Morris Berg, United States Civilian, rendered exceptionally meritorious service of high value to the war effort from April 1944 to January 1946. In a position of responsibility in the European Theater, he exhibited analytical abilities and a keen planning mind. He inspired both respect and constant high level of endeavor on the part of his subordinates which enabled his section to produce studies and analysis vital to the mounting of American operations."

After his death, his sister, Ethel, requested and accepted the award on his behalf, later donating it to the Baseball Hall of Fame.

- In 1996 Berg was inducted into the National Jewish Sports Hall of Fame.
- In 2000 he was inducted into the Baseball Reliquary's Shrine of the Eternals.
- His is the only baseball card on display at the headquarters of the Central Intelligence Agency.
- Nicholas Dawidoff wrote Berg's biography in The Catcher Was a Spy: The Mysterious Life of Moe Berg (1994).
- The biographical film The Catcher Was a Spy (2018) was based on Nicholas Dawidoff's book. The film was directed by Ben Lewin, and Berg was played by Paul Rudd. It premiered at the 2018 Sundance Film Festival.

== See also ==
- Jews and Baseball: An American Love Story, 2010 documentary
- List of Jewish Major League Baseball players
- Operation Alsos

Sporting positions
Preceded by Hugh Duffy	Boston Red Sox first-base coach 1940–1941	Succeeded by Larry Woodall
