= The Catcher Was a Spy =

1994 biography of Moe Berg by Nicholas Dawidoff

- Author: Nicholas Dawidoff
- Language: English
- Subject: Biography
- Published: Pantheon Books
- Publication date: 1994
- Publication place: United States
- Media type: Print
- Pages: 455
- ISBN: 978-0-679-41566-4
- Dewey Decimal: 940.54 8673-dc20

The Catcher Was a Spy: The Mysterious Life of Moe Berg is a 1994 biography written by Nicholas Dawidoff about a major league baseball player who also worked for the Office of Strategic Services, the forerunner of the Central Intelligence Agency. Moe Berg, the subject of the book, was an enigmatic person who hid much of his private life from those who knew him and who spent his later decades as a jobless drifter living off the good will of friends and relatives.

The book spent seven weeks on The New York Times Best Seller list, which described the biography as "The life of Moe Berg, big-league catcher, O.S.S. agent, lady's man, and freeloader."

== Book summary ==
=== Early years ===
Berg was born in 1902 to a Jewish couple that lived in New York City, not far from the Polo Grounds, the home of the New York Giants baseball team. His father, Bernard Berg, was a pharmacist who emigrated from Ukraine in part to escape from what he considered to be the oppressive nature of an almost entirely Jewish village. Berg's mother, Rose Tashker, was also a Ukrainian Jew. She was engaged to Bernard prior to his emigration. The couple, along with their three children lived in the Harlem section of New York City until 1906 when Bernard Berg bought a pharmacy in West Newark, New Jersey. Subsequently, the family moved to the Roseville section of Newark.

Berg began playing baseball at the age of seven and, to the dismay of his father who did not understand American sports, continued through his high school years. After his high school graduation, Berg enrolled in New York University but eventually transferred to Princeton University and for the remainder of his life, always associated himself with Princeton, ignoring his time at NYU. Always an excellent student, Berg studied seven languages: Latin, Greek, French, Spanish, Italian, German, and Sanskrit and subsequently received a B.A. in modern languages. During his student years at Princeton, Berg played first base and shortstop. Although he was not a good hitter and was a slow baserunner, his fielding, arm strength, and knowledge of the game led to his being appointed as team captain in his senior season. His performance at Princeton caused both the New York Giants and the Brooklyn Dodgers to express interest in him, and after graduation Berg accepted a $5,000 contract offered to him by the Dodgers.

=== Professional baseball career ===
Berg's career as a professional baseball player spanned 16 years, most of it spent as a journeyman backup catcher for the Dodgers, Chicago White Sox, Cleveland Indians, Washington Senators, and Boston Red Sox. Berg also spent time at the minor league level playing for the Minneapolis Millers of the American Association, and the Reading Keystones of the International League. During the early part of his career, Berg attended Columbia Law School, causing him to miss several weeks of spring training for the White Sox. Berg eventually graduated in 1930 and passed the New York Bar Exam, but his absence from spring training resulted in him being benched in favor of other players.

Notably, Berg visited Japan on two occasions during his baseball career. His first trip was arranged by Herb Hunter and was intended to teach baseball at Japanese universities during the winter of 1932. After the instruction was completed, Berg remained behind to explore Japan. He then visited Manchuria, Shanghai, Peking, Indochina, Siam, India, Egypt and Berlin. Berg's ability to learn languages rapidly helped him greatly in his travels. Berg's second trip to Japan came about in 1934 when Hunter arranged for a group of all-stars to play against Japanese teams. Although Berg was only a backup catcher, his proficiency in the Japanese language resulted in his joining Babe Ruth, Lou Gehrig, and Jimmie Foxx on the team. Prior to his departure from the United States, Berg contracted with MovietoneNews, to film the sights of his trip. As part of that effort, he took along a movie camera which he used with great success in surreptitiously filming industrial and military facilities in Japan during the trip. The film footage proved to be valuable as the increasingly militarized Japan had restricted the movement of foreigners and made it extremely difficult for outsiders to gather intelligence. By the time Berg's career was coming to an end, he had gained a reputation as one of the game's smartest players, and was a favorite of newspaper reporters who enjoyed writing the storyline of the Princeton language scholar and New York lawyer who was also a big league catcher. But the final years Berg spent as a player, and then a coach, for the Red Sox caused both teammates and reporters to raise questions about his actual role with the team. Aside from giving foreign language lessons to members of the bullpen, he was unusually quiet and reserved and did little more than help warm up pitchers who were about to enter the game. Berg himself only batted 33 times during the 1939 season. "Not a lot of pep or vinegar" is how he was described by Ted Williams who was one of Berg's young teammates.

=== Berg's role as a spy in World War II and the years following ===
Berg was 39 years old when the United States entered World War II, and at that age believed the best contribution he could make to the war effort was to use his language skills to further the Allied cause. Using his numerous connections, Berg was offered a position with the Office of the Coordinator of Inter-American Affairs in 1942. His duties included traveling to South America, where he inspected the living conditions of soldiers manning remote outposts while guarding against an attack on the Americas by the Axis powers. Berg's reputation as a ballplayer, along with his legal training and foreign language skills enabled him to move effortlessly between troops, general officers, diplomats, and foreign politicians. However, Berg soon began looking for ways to make a more pivotal contribution to the war effort and decided to apply for a position with the Office of Strategic Services (OSS). His application was accepted and subsequently, he spent the majority of his time in Europe, performing a variety of missions, many of them related to Germany's work on nuclear energy and atomic weapons. One of Berg's missions involved a trip to neutral Switzerland where he was to attend a lecture German physicist Werner Heisenberg was giving in Zürich. Berg's orders were to determine if Heisenberg's work with nuclear energy was assisting the Germans in developing a nuclear bomb. If Berg determined that it was and that the Germans were close, he was to kill Heisenberg. Berg attended the lecture, armed with a pistol, but determined that Heisenberg's efforts and Germany's progress in developing a weapon were overstated. Later, Berg befriended Heisenberg, and along with his other work both in Switzerland and later in Italy, helped convince U.S. military officials that Germany was not on the verge of developing an atomic bomb.

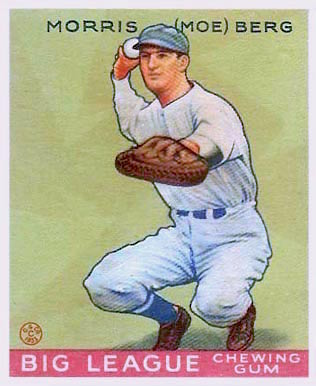
Moe Berg, professional baseball player

=== Later years ===
Despite his law degree and offers to coach in the major leagues, Berg opted to live with his brother, Dr. Samuel Berg, in New Jersey and spend the remainder of his life unemployed, living off the good will of friends and family. When people asked Berg what he did for a living, he would slowly draw his finger to his lips as if to silence both the question and answer, giving the impression that he was still involved in spying, which he was not. Popular with men of influence and considered a womanizer, over the years Berg began making some people, especially women and small children, uncomfortable. On at least two occasions, Berg may have touched or fondled small children in a sexual manner. After 17 years of living with his brother, Berg was told to leave and find another place to live. He eventually moved in with his sister Ethel in Belleville, New Jersey, where he remained for the rest of his life.

In May 1972, Berg was hospitalized after a fall. His condition worsened as doctors could not identify the cause of his decline which was eventually diagnosed as an aortic aneurism. On May 29, 1972, Berg died. His last words were in the form of a question to his nurse: "How are the Mets doing today?" He died before she could answer.

Ethel Berg buried her brother's ashes in a cemetery outside of Newark. Sam, Berg's brother, visited the grave yearly until his sister became gravely ill in 1986 and revealed to him that she had dug up the urn containing Berg's ashes in 1974 and had taken them to Israel for burial. She had entrusted the urn to a rabbi who buried Berg's remains on Mount Scopus, overlooking Jerusalem, but she could not remember exactly where.

"For years, Dr. Sam tried to learn where the grave was located so that Berg could be brought home and be buried with his family. But the rabbi could not tell him. Dr. Sam died in 1990 at the age of 92 so the final mystery of Moe Berg's inscrutable life is that nobody knows where he is."

== Reviews ==
The Catcher Was a Spy proved to be a popular book, spending seven weeks on the New York Times best-seller list. Critics praised Dawidoff's thorough research and ability to tie together the many facets of Berg's life.

"Dawidoff ... has done heroic research, much of it in unlit corners, and he avoids the temptation of rehashing it to excess. For the most part he also eschews the temptations of amateur psychoanalysis; when he does succumb, it is mostly to revealing effect. Moe Berg doubtless will forever remain a mystery, but Dawidoff has brought the mystery to life."

"...dealing with Berg's famous elusiveness is where Mr. Dawidoff's biography shines the brightest. This is not an easy subject to write about, since Berg grew increasingly evasive as he got older and during the final 25 years of his life he had no employment or ordered routine. In his final chapter, "The Secret Life of Moe Berg", Dawidoff undertakes a psychobiography of his subject and plumbs what he has earlier hinted at. Berg was always blind to his real feelings, the author suggests, and nearly lost control of himself toward the end. What he could never resolve was his own love of baseball and his immigrant father's stern disapproval of the game. Nor could he reconcile his father's rejection of religion with society's insistence on viewing Berg as a Jew. These confusions produced a sense of self-distrust. The way to avoid the pain of confrontation was to stay always on the run and let no one pin him down. While the foregoing analysis may sound presumptuous in summary, in Mr. Dawidoff's sensitive treatment it seems both tasteful and plausible [and] Moe Berg's life finally makes sense."

"Berg claimed that he had taken films in Japan during an off-season baseball barnstorming tour in 1934 that were useful to the U.S. military after Pearl Harbor, and that he had worked for the OSS in Europe during the war, assessing whether Germany might make good on its promise to use an atomic device as its last, and most devastating, super-weapon. Nicholas Dawidoff's meticulously researched biography reveals that both stories were essentially true, although both were embellished by Berg, who spent the last quarter-century of his life as a freeloader whose currency as a house guest was not only his wide-ranging intelligence, but the assumption of most of his hosts, never contradicted by their guest, that he continued to be a spy. He wasn't. Dawidoff describes a lonely soul who could bear only infrequent intimacy-he had a few serious relationships with women, and no close male friends ... As Dawidoff tracks his elusive subject, it is easy to agree with a bookseller who described Berg as "a professional liar, a layabout who lived on his brother ... a self-invented mystery, a charming chap, but an outright fraud. The mystery is that there is no mystery."

Not all critics were complimentary of Dawidoff's treatment of Berg, who had previously been held in awe by his many fans.

"Dawidoff has taken a mythic character and exposed him as an eccentric crank whose oversized feet were made almost entirely of clay. Dawidoff has accumulated a vast body of information in a remarkable job of research, especially considering that Berg, who died of a heart attack at age 70 in 1972, deliberately cloaked the details of his life in mystery. What Dawidoff has failed to do is distill it into a story calculated to hold a reader's interest. Rather, he presents an almost legalistic mass of evidence to prove that Berg followed up a career (1923–39) as a pseudo intellectual, third-string catcher by becoming a mediocre WW II spy, and then spent the last 25 years of his life as an unemployed vagabond, living off his charm and his wit and his vast store of friends. The only mystery left at the end of the book is whether to feel pity for Berg as a tragic, unfulfilled genius or irritation with him as a boor who gets more attention than he deserved. The reader is left knowing immeasurably more about Moe Berg, and caring immeasurably less."

== Film adaptation ==
In April 2016, it was announced that American actor Paul Rudd would portray Berg in the upcoming biographical film The Catcher Was a Spy. The film was directed by Ben Lewin and received its world premiere on January 19, 2018, at the 2018 Sundance Film Festival.
