= Bragg plane =

Concept in physics

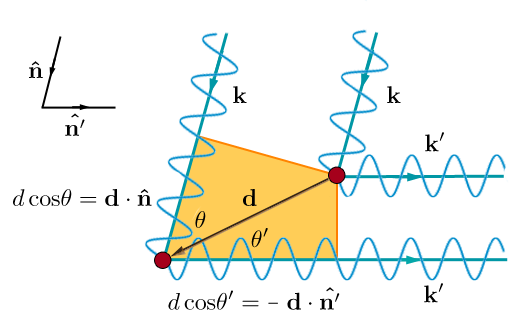
Ray diagram of Von Laue formulation

In physics, a Bragg plane is a plane in reciprocal space which bisects a reciprocal lattice vector, $\scriptstyle \mathbf{K}$, at right angles. The Bragg plane is defined as part of the Von Laue condition for diffraction peaks in x-ray diffraction crystallography.

Considering the adjacent diagram, the arriving x-ray plane wave is defined by:

$$e^{i\mathbf{k} \cdot \mathbf{r}} = \cos {(\mathbf{k} \cdot \mathbf{r})} + i\sin {(\mathbf{k} \cdot \mathbf{r})}$$

Where $\scriptstyle \mathbf{k}$ is the incident wave vector given by:

$$\mathbf{k} = \frac{2\pi}{\lambda}\hat{n}$$

where $\scriptstyle \lambda$ is the wavelength of the incident photon. While the Bragg formulation assumes a unique choice of direct lattice planes and specular reflection of the incident X-rays, the Von Laue formula only assumes monochromatic light and that each scattering center acts as a source of secondary wavelets as described by the Huygens principle. Each scattered wave contributes to a new plane wave given by:

$$\mathbf{k^\prime} = \frac{2\pi}{\lambda}\hat{n}^\prime$$

The condition for constructive interference in the $\scriptstyle \hat{n}^\prime$ direction is that the path difference between the photons is an integer multiple (m) of their wavelength. We know then that for constructive interference we have:

$$|\mathbf{d}|\cos{\theta} + |\mathbf{d}|\cos{\theta^\prime} = \mathbf{d} \cdot \left(\hat{n} - \hat{n}^\prime\right) = m\lambda$$

where $\scriptstyle m ~\in~ \mathbb{Z}$. Multiplying the above by $\scriptstyle \frac{2\pi}{\lambda}$ we formulate the condition in terms of the wave vectors, $\scriptstyle \mathbf{k}$ and $\scriptstyle \mathbf{k^\prime}$:

$$\mathbf{d} \cdot \left(\mathbf{k} - \mathbf{k^\prime}\right) = 2\pi m$$

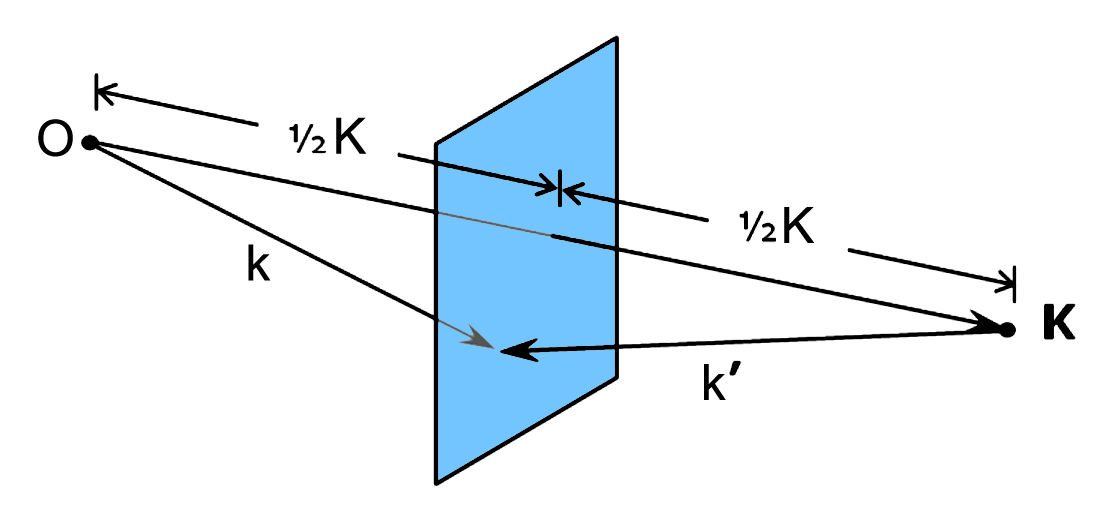
The Bragg plane in blue, with its associated reciprocal lattice vector K.

Now consider that a crystal is an array of scattering centres, each at a point in the Bravais lattice. We can set one of the scattering centres as the origin of an array. Since the lattice points are displaced by the Bravais lattice vectors, $\scriptstyle \mathbf{R}$, scattered waves interfere constructively when the above condition holds simultaneously for all values of $\scriptstyle \mathbf{R}$ which are Bravais lattice vectors, the condition then becomes:

$$\mathbf{R} \cdot \left(\mathbf{k} - \mathbf{k^\prime}\right) = 2\pi m$$

An equivalent statement (see mathematical description of the reciprocal lattice) is to say that:

$$e^{i\left(\mathbf{k} - \mathbf{k^\prime}\right) \cdot \mathbf{R}} = 1$$

By comparing this equation with the definition of a reciprocal lattice vector, we see that constructive interference occurs if $\scriptstyle \mathbf{K} ~=~ \mathbf{k} \,-\, \mathbf{k^\prime}$ is a vector of the reciprocal lattice. We notice that $\scriptstyle \mathbf{k}$ and $\scriptstyle \mathbf{k^\prime}$ have the same magnitude, we can restate the Von Laue formulation as requiring that the tip of incident wave vector, $\scriptstyle \mathbf{k}$, must lie in the plane that is a perpendicular bisector of the reciprocal lattice vector, $\scriptstyle \mathbf{K}$. This reciprocal space plane is the Bragg plane.

== See also ==
- X-ray crystallography
- Reciprocal lattice
- Bravais lattice
- Powder diffraction
- Kikuchi line
- Brillouin zone
