= Catcher (disambiguation) =

Catcher is a position for a baseball or softball player. It is also a general term for a fielder who catches the ball in cricket.

Catcher or catchers may also refer to:

- Circus performer who catches the flyer on the flying trapeze
- Catchers (band), Irish indie pop band
- The Catcher, 1998 horror film directed by Guy Crawford and Yvette Hoffman

== See also ==
- Foxcatcher, 2014 American true crime sports drama film directed by Bennett Miller
