= Paul Scherrer =

Swiss physicist (1890–1969)

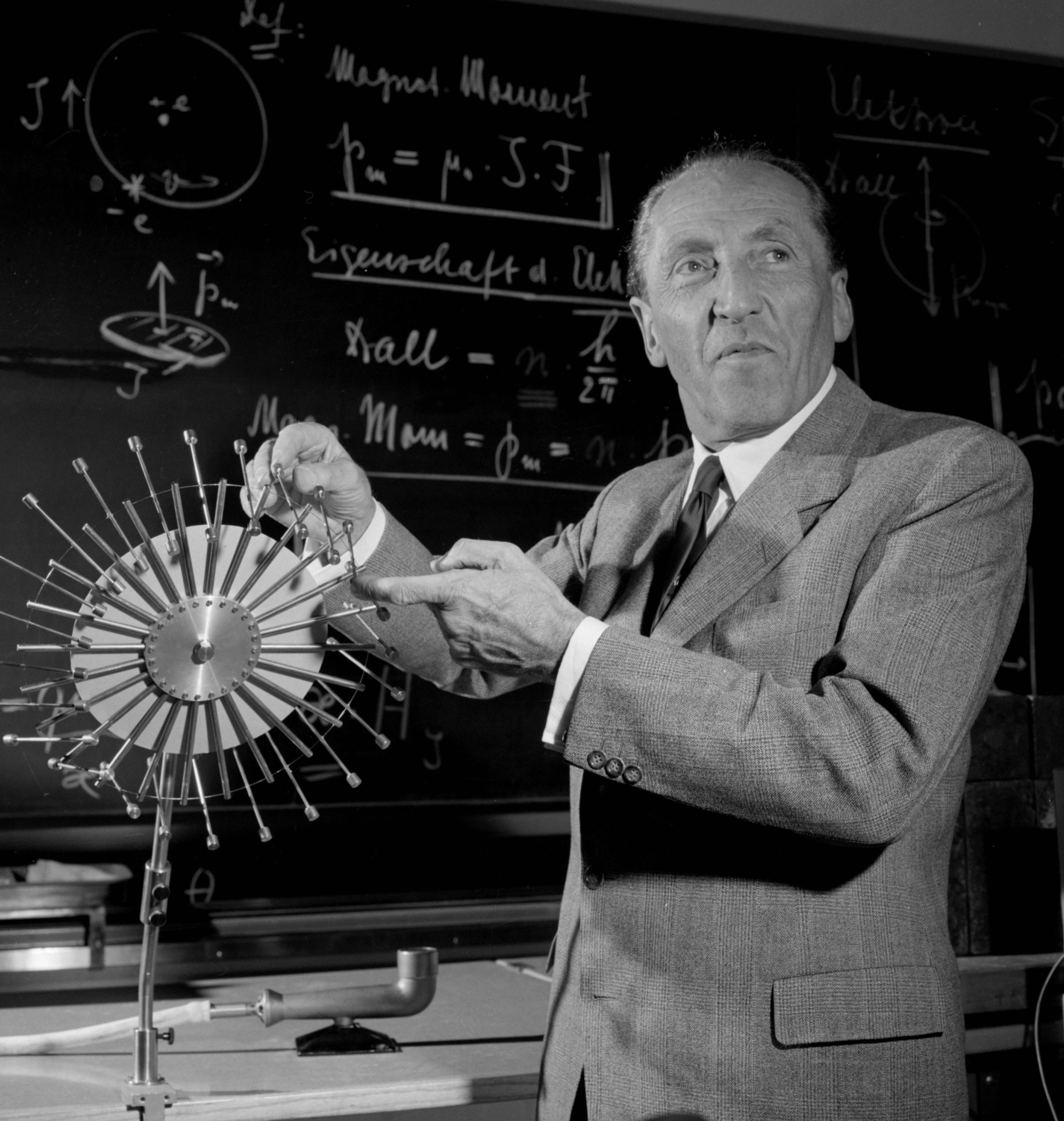
- Born: Paul Hermann Scherrer; 3 February 1890; St. Gallen, Switzerland
- Died: 25 September 1969 (aged 79); Zürich, Switzerland
- Education: Swiss Federal Polytechnic; University of Göttingen
- Known for: Debye–Scherrer method Scherrer equation
- Awards: Marcel Benoist Prize (1943); Honoris Causa doctorate by the Complutense University of Madrid (1966)
- Scientific career
- Fields: Physicist
- Workplaces: ETH Zurich; University of Göttingen
- Doctoral advisor: Peter Debye
- Doctoral students: Felix Boehm; Egon Bretscher; Hans Frauenfelder; Bernd T. Matthias; Julius Adams Stratton; Fritz Zwicky

Signature
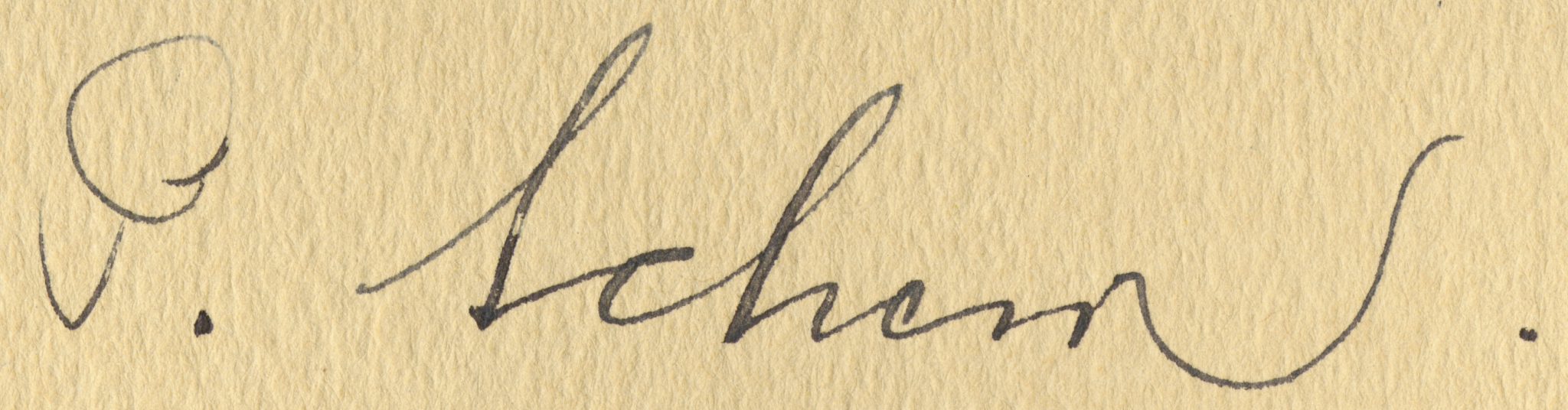

Paul Hermann Scherrer (3 February 1890 – 25 September 1969) was a Swiss physicist. Born in St. Gallen, Switzerland, he studied at Göttingen, Germany, before becoming a lecturer there. Later, Scherrer became head of the Department of Physics at ETH Zurich.

== Early life and studies ==
Paul Scherrer was born in St. Gallen. In 1908, he enrolled at the Swiss Federal Polytechnic (later known as ETH Zurich), changing course from Botany to Mathematics and Physics after two semesters. In 1912, Scherrer spent one semester at Königsberg University, then undertook further studies at the University of Göttingen, graduating from there with a doctorate on the Faraday effect in the hydrogen molecule. In 1916, while still working on his dissertation, he and his tutor, Peter Debye, developed the "Debye–Scherrer powder method", a procedure using X-rays for the structural analysis of crystals. This made an important contribution to the development of the scattering techniques that are still used in the large facilities at the Paul Scherrer Institute to this day. Debye received the Nobel Prize in Chemistry for this work in 1936.

He is perhaps best known for determining the inverse relationship between the width of an X-ray diffraction peak and the crystallite size. This work was published in 1918.

ETH Zurich appointed Scherrer to the post of Professor of Experimental Physics in 1920, at the early age of 30. In 1925, he organised the first international conference of physicists to take place after the First World War. He became Principal of the Physical Institute at ETH in 1927 and focused its direction on nuclear physics, a research branch that was still coming into being at that stage. The first cyclotron at ETH Zurich was built under his direction in 1940.

== Nuclear and atomic physics ==
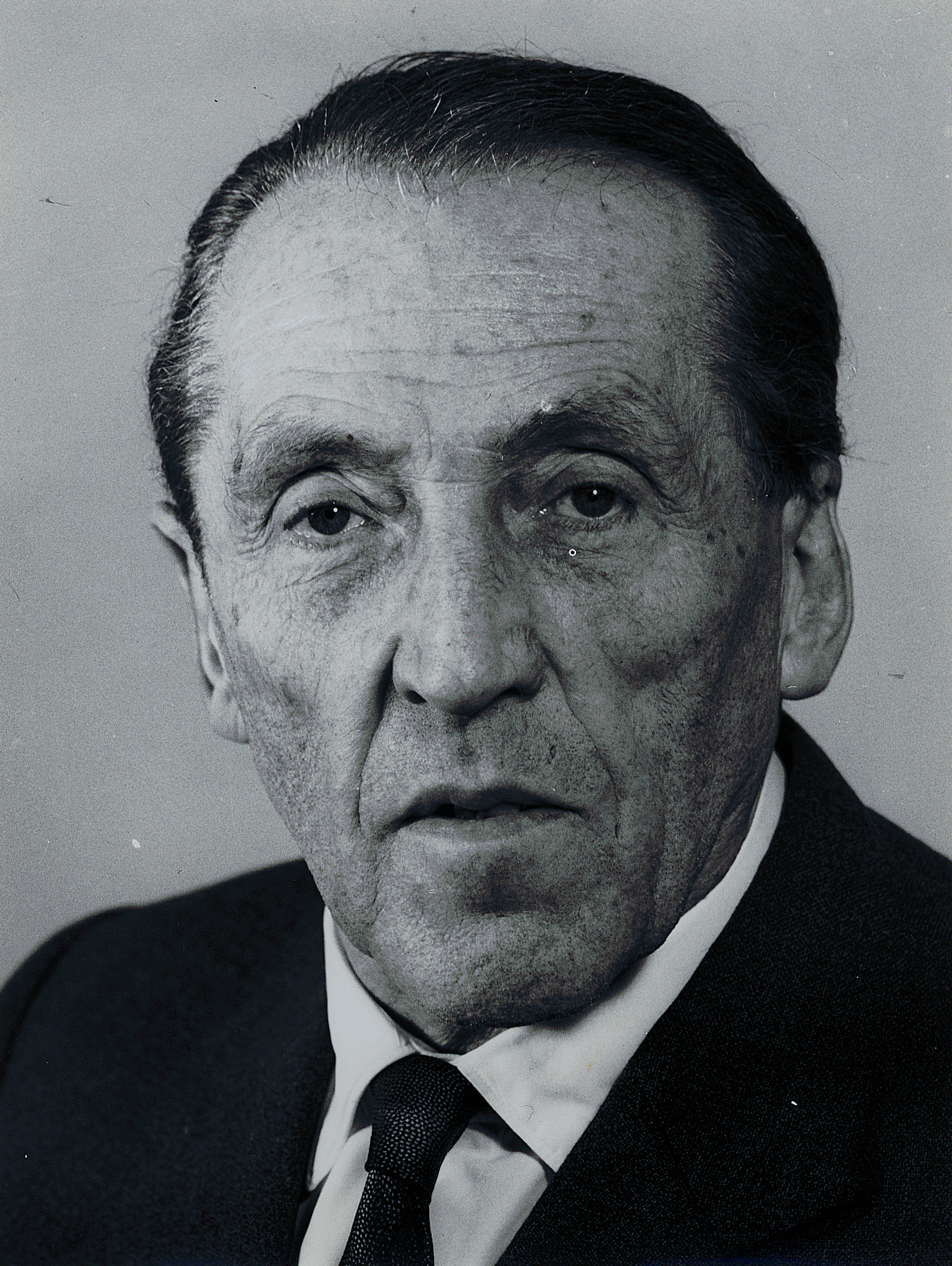
Scherrer in c. 1960

Beginning in late 1944, Scherrer became close to Moe Berg and, through Berg, gave the United States information about German science and German scientists, especially related to efforts to develop a nuclear weapon. Scherrer later became the foremost proponent of Switzerland developing its own nuclear weapons with enriched uranium supplied by Belgian Congo, a program which was pursued by the government for 43 years and abandoned in 1988 by Arnold Koller, then member of the Swiss Federal Council and head of the Swiss military department.

In parallel with his main professional occupation as a researcher and leader of an institution, Paul Scherrer also served in various institutions and committees involved in the dissemination of nuclear energy in Switzerland: the Swiss Federal Council appointed him to the post of President of the Swiss Study Commission on Atomic Energy (Schweizerischen Studienkommission für Atomenergie) in 1946, and President of the Swiss Commission for Atomic Sciences in 1958.

In addition, Scherrer took part in establishing CERN near Geneva in 1952–54. When established he became one of the original members of the Scientific Policy Committee, at which he served until the end of 1963, and the CERN Council. Furthermore, he participated in setting up Reaktor AG, to study the construction and operation of nuclear fission facilities one year later, in Würenlingen.

His abilities and foresight led to the early development of new branches of solid-state physics, particle physics and electronics, which made a vital contribution to the high standard of research at Swiss universities. When Scherrer was made emeritus professor in 1960, after 40 years at ETH Zurich, he took up a teaching appointment at the University of Basel and his former students and friends put together a Festschrift.

== Private life ==
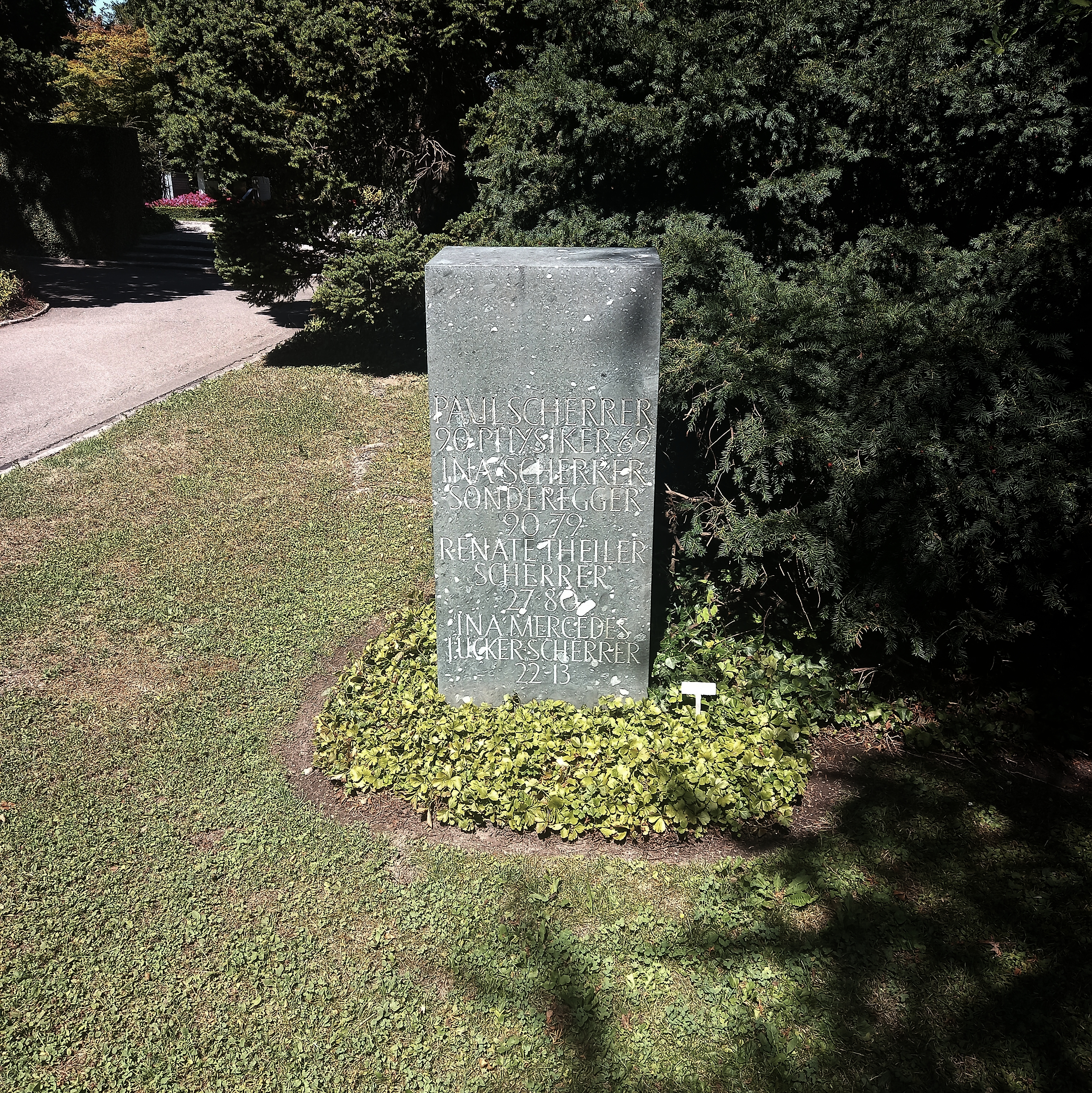
The Scherrer family tomb: Paul Scherrer, his wife Ina Sonderegger, and their daughters Ines Jucker and Renate Theiler at Friedhof Fluntern in Zürich.

In 1922 Scherrer married Ina Sonderegger, with whom he had two daughters.

He died on 25 September 1969 after a horse-riding accident.

== Legacy ==
The eponymous Paul Scherrer Institute, based near Villigen in canton of Aargau, was established on 1 January 1988 by merging the 1960 established EIR (Eidgenössisches Institut für Reaktorforschung, Federal Institute for Reactor Research) and the 1968 established SIN (Schweizerisches Institut für Nuklearphysik, Swiss Institute for Nuclear Physics) with Jean-Pierre Blaser (SIN founder) named its first director.

There is a street, Route Scherrer, named after Scherrer at CERN, Geneva.
