= Herb Hunter (baseball) =

American baseball player (1895–1970)

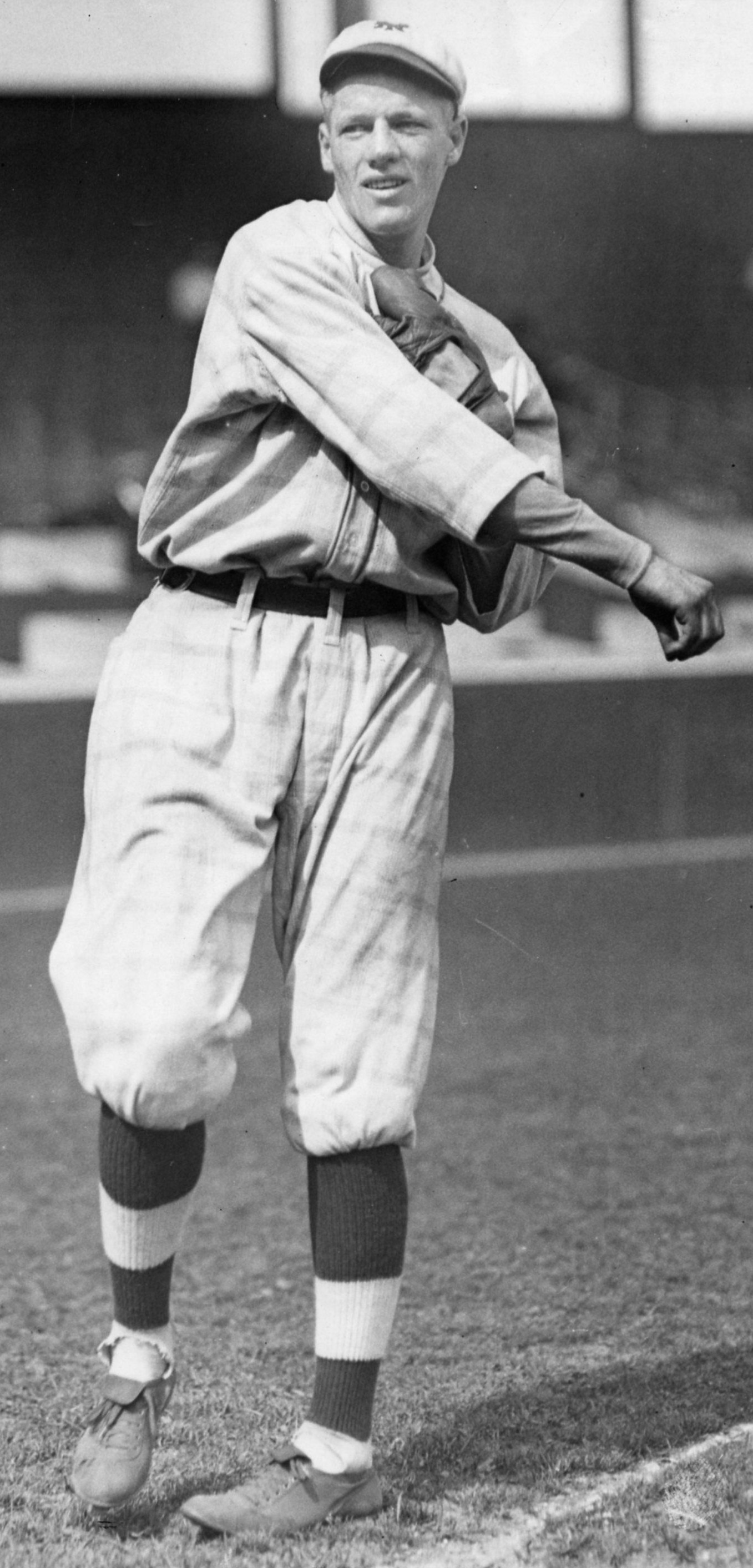
- Third baseman
- Born: December 25, 1895; Boston, Massachusetts, U.S.
- Died: July 25, 1970 (aged 74); Orlando, Florida, U.S.
- Batted: Left Threw: Right

MLB debut
- April 29, 1916, for the New York Giants

Last MLB appearance
- October 1, 1921, for the St. Louis Cardinals

MLB statistics
- Batting average: .163
- Home runs: 1
- Runs batted in: 4
- Stats at Baseball Reference

Teams
- New York Giants (1916); Chicago Cubs (1916–17); Boston Red Sox (1920); St. Louis Cardinals (1921)

Herbert Harrison Hunter (December 25, 1895 – July 25, 1970) was an American utility infielder–outfielder in Major League Baseball who played parts of four seasons between 1916 and 1921. Listed at 6 ft 0.5 in (1.84 m), 165 lb., Hunter batted left-handed and threw right-handed. He was born in Boston, Massachusetts.

== Early career ==
After making his debut for the New York Giants in 1916, Hunter was soon traded by the Giants, along with Larry Doyle and Merwin Jacobson, to the Chicago Cubs in exchange for Heinie Zimmerman and Mickey Doolan. He played two games with the Cubs in 1916 and another three in 1917. During World War I, Hunter served in the United States Navy, missing both the 1918 and 1919 seasons.

== Post-World War I ==
After the war, Hunter surfaced for another brief major league stint in 1920, this time for the Boston Red Sox. Later that year, Hunter organized a team of minor and major league players — dubbed the Hunter All-Americans — to go on a barnstorming tour of Japan, the first of three such trips he would put together.

In 1921, Hunter made his last big league appearance, a nine-game stint with the St. Louis Cardinals during which he served mostly as a pinch runner (though not a very successful one, as he was caught on all three of his stolen base attempts).

== Minor leagues and more touring ==
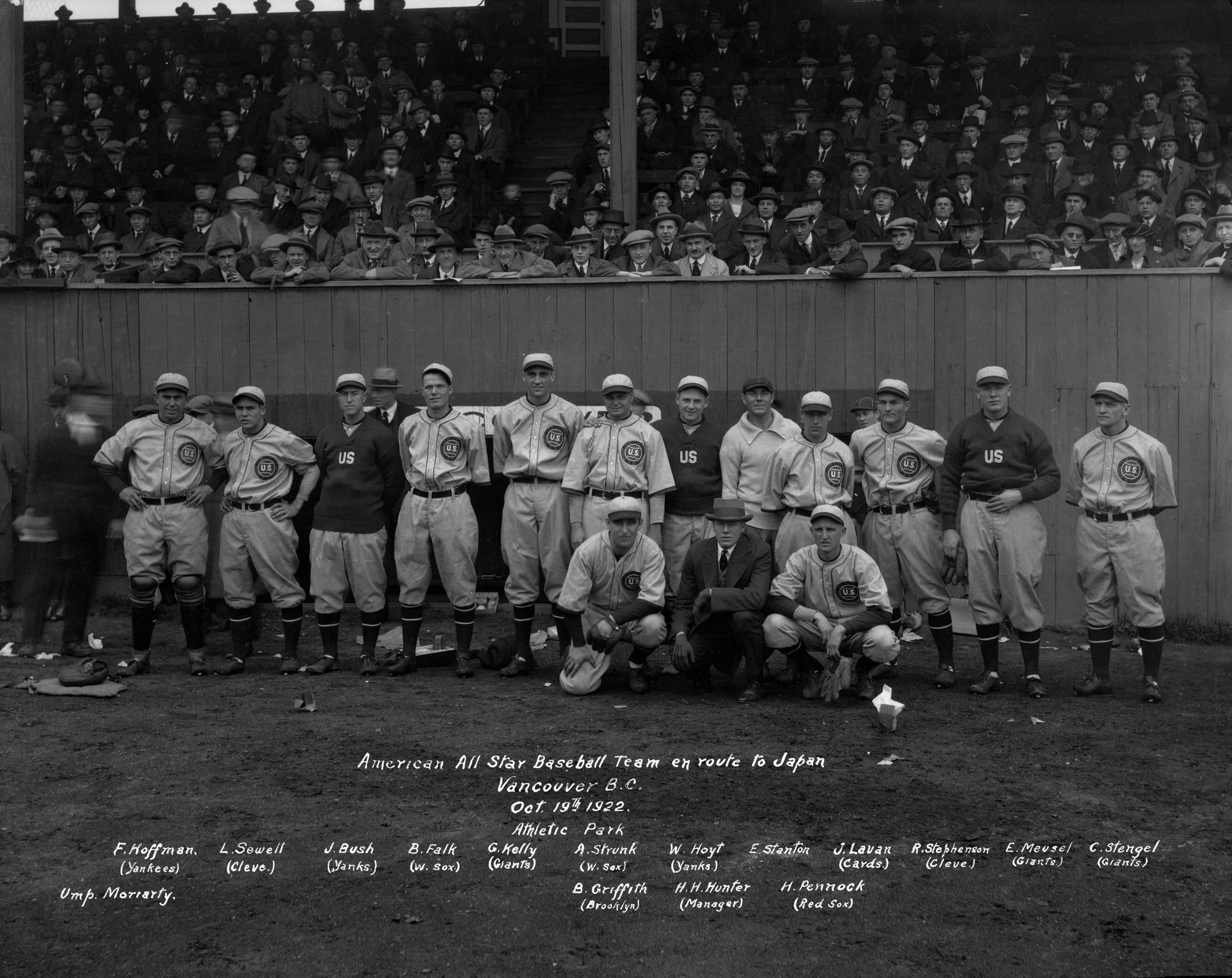
Hunter's All-Stars, the 1922 team that toured Japan. Seen in Vancouver before boarding a ship for Japan. Hunter is in the front row, between the two players, wearing a suit and a hat.

His major league career over, Hunter put together another barnstorming tour of Japan in 1922, this time with a larger contingent of major league players. Hunter continued to play in the minor leagues through 1929. Then, in 1931, he put together one more tour of Japan, and this time the roster was much more impressive, featuring several future Hall of Famers, including Lefty Grove, Lou Gehrig, and Mickey Cochrane.

== Post-baseball life ==
Financial concerns caused Hunter to get out of the touring team business, turning things over to Lefty O'Doul for future endeavors. After again serving in the U.S. Navy in World War II, Hunter moved to Orlando, Florida, going into the real estate business. He died there in 1970 at the age of 74.

== Sources ==
- Career statistics from Baseball Reference · Baseball Reference (Minors) · Retrosheet · Baseball Almanac
