= Surface science =

Study of physical and chemical phenomena that occur at the interface of two phases

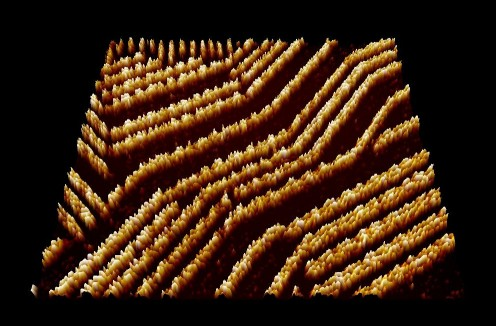
STM image of a quinacridone adsorbate. The self-assembled supramolecular chains of the organic semiconductor are adsorbed on a graphite surface.

Surface science is the study of physical and chemical phenomena that occur at the interface of two phases, including solid–liquid interfaces, solid–gas interfaces, solid–vacuum interfaces, and liquid–gas interfaces. It includes the fields of surface chemistry and surface physics. Some related practical applications are classed as surface engineering. The science encompasses concepts such as heterogeneous catalysis, semiconductor device fabrication, fuel cells, self-assembled monolayers, and adhesives. Surface science is closely related to interface and colloid science. Interfacial chemistry and physics are common subjects for both. The methods are different. In addition, interface and colloid science studies macroscopic phenomena that occur in heterogeneous systems due to peculiarities of interfaces.

== History ==
The field of surface chemistry started with a woman named Agnes Pockels, who pioneered the study of surface tension and created the Pockels slide trough, basis for the Langmuir-Blodgett trough despite being denied access to academic laboratories multiple times. Around the same time, heterogeneous catalysis was pioneered by Paul Sabatier on hydrogenation and Fritz Haber on the Haber process. Irving Langmuir was also one of the founders of this field, and the scientific journal on surface science, Langmuir, bears his name. The Langmuir adsorption equation is used to model monolayer adsorption where all surface adsorption sites have the same affinity for the adsorbing species and do not interact with each other. Gerhard Ertl in 1974 described for the first time the adsorption of hydrogen on a palladium surface using a novel technique called LEED. Similar studies with platinum, nickel, and iron followed. Most recent developments in surface sciences include the 2007 Nobel prize of Chemistry winner Gerhard Ertl's advancements in surface chemistry, specifically his investigation of the interaction between carbon monoxide molecules and platinum surfaces.

== Chemistry ==
Surface chemistry can be roughly defined as the study of chemical reactions at interfaces. It is closely related to surface engineering, which aims at modifying the chemical composition of a surface by incorporation of selected elements or functional groups that produce various desired effects or improvements in the properties of the surface or interface. Surface science is of particular importance to the fields of heterogeneous catalysis, electrochemistry, and geochemistry.

=== Catalysis ===
The adhesion of gas or liquid molecules to the surface is known as adsorption. This can be due to either chemisorption or physisorption, and the strength of molecular adsorption to a catalyst surface is critically important to the catalyst's performance (see Sabatier principle). However, it is difficult to study these phenomena in real catalyst particles, which have complex structures. Instead, well-defined single crystal surfaces of catalytically active materials such as platinum are often used as model catalysts. Multi-component materials systems are used to study interactions between catalytically active metal particles and supporting oxides; these are produced by growing ultra-thin films or particles on a single crystal surface.

Relationships between the composition, structure, and chemical behavior of these surfaces are studied using ultra-high vacuum techniques, including adsorption and temperature-programmed desorption of molecules, scanning tunneling microscopy, low energy electron diffraction, and Auger electron spectroscopy. Results can be fed into chemical models or used toward the rational design of new catalysts. Reaction mechanisms can also be clarified due to the atomic-scale precision of surface science measurements.

=== Electrochemistry ===
Electrochemistry is the study of processes driven through an applied potential at a solid–liquid or liquid–liquid interface. The behavior of an electrode–electrolyte interface is affected by the distribution of ions in the liquid phase next to the interface forming the electrical double layer. Adsorption and desorption events can be studied at atomically flat single-crystal surfaces as a function of applied potential, time and solution conditions using spectroscopy, scanning probe microscopy and surface X-ray scattering. These studies link traditional electrochemical techniques such as cyclic voltammetry to direct observations of interfacial processes.

=== Geochemistry ===
Geological phenomena such as iron cycling and soil contamination are controlled by the interfaces between minerals and their environment. The atomic-scale structure and chemical properties of mineral–solution interfaces are studied using in situ synchrotron X-ray techniques such as X-ray reflectivity, X-ray standing waves, and X-ray absorption spectroscopy as well as scanning probe microscopy. For example, studies of heavy metal or actinide adsorption onto mineral surfaces reveal molecular-scale details of adsorption, enabling more accurate predictions of how these contaminants travel through soils or disrupt natural dissolution–precipitation cycles.

== Physics ==
Surface physics can be roughly defined as the study of physical interactions that occur at interfaces. It overlaps with surface chemistry. Some of the topics investigated in surface physics include friction, surface states, surface diffusion, surface reconstruction, surface phonons and plasmons, epitaxy, the emission and tunneling of electrons, spintronics, and the self-assembly of nanostructures on surfaces. Techniques to investigate processes at surfaces include surface X-ray scattering, scanning probe microscopy, surface-enhanced Raman spectroscopy and X-ray photoelectron spectroscopy.

== Analysis techniques ==
The study and analysis of surfaces involves both physical and chemical analysis techniques.

Several modern methods probe the topmost 1–10 nm of surfaces exposed to vacuum. These include angle-resolved photoemission spectroscopy (ARPES), X-ray photoelectron spectroscopy (XPS), Auger electron spectroscopy (AES), low-energy electron diffraction (LEED), electron energy loss spectroscopy (EELS), thermal desorption spectroscopy (TPD), ion scattering spectroscopy (ISS), secondary ion mass spectrometry, dual-polarization interferometry, and other surface analysis methods included in the list of materials analysis methods. Many of these techniques require vacuum as they rely on the detection of electrons or ions emitted from the surface under study. Moreover, in general ultra-high vacuum, in the range of 10^{−7} pascal pressure or better, it is necessary to reduce surface contamination by residual gas, by reducing the number of molecules reaching the sample over a given time period. At 0.1 mPa (10^{−6} torr) partial pressure of a contaminant and standard temperature, it only takes on the order of 1 second to cover a surface with a one-to-one monolayer of contaminant to surface atoms, so much lower pressures are needed for measurements. This is found by an order of magnitude estimate for the (number) specific surface area of materials and the impingement rate formula from the kinetic theory of gases.

Purely optical techniques can be used to study interfaces under a wide variety of conditions. Reflection-absorption infrared, dual polarisation interferometry, surface-enhanced Raman spectroscopy and sum frequency generation spectroscopy can be used to probe solid–vacuum as well as solid–gas, solid–liquid, and liquid–gas surfaces. Multi-parametric surface plasmon resonance works in solid–gas, solid–liquid, liquid–gas surfaces and can detect even sub-nanometer layers. It probes the interaction kinetics as well as dynamic structural changes such as liposome collapse or swelling of layers in different pH. Dual-polarization interferometry is used to quantify the order and disruption in birefringent thin films. This has been used, for example, to study the formation of lipid bilayers and their interaction with membrane proteins.

Acoustic techniques, such as quartz crystal microbalance with dissipation monitoring, is used for time-resolved measurements of solid–vacuum, solid–gas and solid–liquid interfaces. The method allows for analysis of molecule–surface interactions as well as structural changes and viscoelastic properties of the adlayer.

X-ray scattering and spectroscopy techniques are also used to characterize surfaces and interfaces. While some of these measurements can be performed using laboratory X-ray sources, many require the high intensity and energy tunability of synchrotron radiation. X-ray crystal truncation rods (CTR) and X-ray standing wave (XSW) measurements probe changes in surface and adsorbate structures with sub-Ångström resolution. Surface-extended X-ray absorption fine structure (SEXAFS) measurements reveal the coordination structure and chemical state of adsorbates. Grazing-incidence small angle X-ray scattering (GISAXS) yields the size, shape, and orientation of nanoparticles on surfaces. The crystal structure and texture of thin films can be investigated using grazing-incidence X-ray diffraction (GIXD, GIXRD).

X-ray photoelectron spectroscopy (XPS) is a standard tool for measuring the chemical states of surface species and for detecting the presence of surface contamination. Surface sensitivity is achieved by detecting photoelectrons with kinetic energies of about 10–1000 eV, which have corresponding inelastic mean free paths of only a few nanometers. This technique has been extended to operate at near-ambient pressures (ambient pressure XPS, AP-XPS) to probe more realistic gas–solid and liquid–solid interfaces. Performing XPS with hard X-rays at synchrotron light sources yields photoelectrons with kinetic energies of several keV (hard X-ray photoelectron spectroscopy, HAXPES), enabling access to chemical information from buried interfaces.

Modern physical analysis methods include scanning-tunneling microscopy (STM) and a family of methods descended from it, including atomic force microscopy (AFM). These microscopies have considerably increased the ability of surface scientists to measure the physical structure of many surfaces. For example, they make it possible to follow reactions at the solid–gas interface in real space, if those proceed on a time scale accessible by the instrument.

== See also ==
- Interface (matter) – Boundary between volumes of matter of different types or states
- Kelvin probe force microscope – Noncontact variant of atomic force microscopy
- Micromeritics – Science and technology of small particles
- Surface modification of biomaterials with proteins
- Surface finishing – Range of processes that alter the surface of an item to achieve a certain property
- Surface modification – Act of modifying the surface of a material
- Surface metrology – Measurement of small-scale features on surfaces
- Surface phenomenon – Study of physical and chemical phenomena that occur at the interface of two phases
- Tribology – Science of rubbing surfaces
