= List of materials analysis methods =

This is a list of analysis methods used in materials science. Analysis methods are listed by their acronym, if one exists.

== Symbols ==
- μSR – see muon spin spectroscopy
- χ – see magnetic susceptibility

== A ==
- AAS – Atomic absorption spectroscopy
- AED – Auger electron diffraction
- AES – Auger electron spectroscopy
- AFM – Atomic force microscopy
- AFS – Atomic fluorescence spectroscopy
- Analytical ultracentrifugation
- APFIM – Atom probe field ion microscopy
- APS – Appearance potential spectroscopy
- ARPES – Angle resolved photoemission spectroscopy
- ARUPS – Angle resolved ultraviolet photoemission spectroscopy
- ATR – Attenuated total reflectance

== B ==
- BET – BET surface area measurement (BET from Brunauer, Emmett, Teller)
- BiFC – Bimolecular fluorescence complementation
- BKD – Backscatter Kikuchi diffraction, see EBSD
- BRET – Bioluminescence resonance energy transfer
- BSED – Back scattered electron diffraction, see EBSD

== C ==
- CAICISS – Coaxial impact collision ion scattering spectroscopy
- CARS – Coherent anti-Stokes Raman spectroscopy
- CBED – Convergent beam electron diffraction
- CCM – Charge collection microscopy
- CDI – Coherent diffraction imaging
- CE – Capillary electrophoresis
- CET – Cryo-electron tomography
- CL – Cathodoluminescence
- CLSM – Confocal laser scanning microscopy
- COSY – Correlation spectroscopy
- Cryo-EM – Cryo-electron microscopy
- Cryo-SEM – Cryo-scanning electron microscopy
- CV – Cyclic voltammetry

== D ==
- DE(T)A – Dielectric thermal analysis
- dHvA – De Haas–van Alphen effect
- DIC – Differential interference contrast microscopy
- Dielectric spectroscopy
- DLS – Dynamic light scattering
- DLTS – Deep-level transient spectroscopy
- DMA – Dynamic mechanical analysis
- DPI – Dual polarisation interferometry
- DRS – Diffuse reflection spectroscopy
- DSC – Differential scanning calorimetry
- DTA – Differential thermal analysis
- DVS – Dynamic vapour sorption

== E ==
- EBIC – Electron beam induced current (see IBIC: ion beam induced charge)
- EBS – Elastic (non-Rutherford) backscattering spectrometry (see RBS)
- EBSD – Electron backscatter diffraction
- ECOSY – Exclusive correlation spectroscopy
- ECT – Electrical capacitance tomography
- EDAX – Energy-dispersive analysis of x-rays
- EDMR – Electrically detected magnetic resonance, see ESR or EPR
- EDS or EDX – Energy dispersive X-ray spectroscopy
- EELS – Electron energy loss spectroscopy
- EFTEM – Energy filtered transmission electron microscopy
- EID – Electron induced desorption
- EIT and ERT – Electrical impedance tomography and electrical resistivity tomography
- EL – Electroluminescence
- Electron crystallography
- ELS – Electrophoretic light scattering
- ENDOR – Electron nuclear double resonance, see ESR or EPR
- EPMA – Electron probe microanalysis
- EPR – Electron paramagnetic resonance spectroscopy
- ERD or ERDA – Elastic recoil detection or elastic recoil detection analysis
- ESCA – Electron spectroscopy for chemical analysis see XPS
- ESD – Electron stimulated desorption
- ESEM – Environmental scanning electron microscopy
- ESI-MS or ES-MS – Electrospray ionization mass spectrometry or electrospray mass spectrometry
- ESR – Electron spin resonance spectroscopy
- ESTM – Electrochemical scanning tunneling microscopy
- EXAFS – Extended X-ray absorption fine structure
- EXSY – Exchange spectroscopy

== F ==
- FCS – Fluorescence correlation spectroscopy
- FCCS – Fluorescence cross-correlation spectroscopy
- FEM – Field emission microscopy
- FIB – Focused ion beam microscopy
- FIM-AP – Field ion microscopy–atom probe
- Flow birefringence
- Fluorescence anisotropy
- FLIM – Fluorescence lifetime imaging
- Fluorescence microscopy
- FOSPM – Feature-oriented scanning probe microscopy
- FRET – Fluorescence resonance energy transfer
- FRS – Forward Recoil Spectrometry, a synonym of ERD
- FTICR or FT-MS – Fourier-transform ion cyclotron resonance or Fourier-transform mass spectrometry
- FTIR – Fourier-transform infrared spectroscopy

== G ==
- GC-MS – Gas chromatography-mass spectrometry
- GDMS – Glow discharge mass spectrometry
- GDOS – Glow discharge optical spectroscopy
- GISAXS – Grazing incidence small angle X-ray scattering
- GIXD – Grazing incidence X-ray diffraction
- GIXR – Grazing incidence X-ray reflectivity
- GLC – Gas-liquid chromatography
- GPC – Gel permeation chromatography

== H ==
- HAADF – High angle annular dark-field imaging
- HAS – Helium atom scattering
- HPLC – High performance liquid chromatography
- HREELS – High resolution electron energy loss spectroscopy
- HREM – High-resolution electron microscopy
- HRTEM – High-resolution transmission electron microscopy
- HI-ERDA – Heavy-ion elastic recoil detection analysis
- HE-PIXE – High-energy proton induced X-ray emission

== I ==
- IAES – Ion induced Auger electron spectroscopy
- IBA – Ion beam analysis
- IBIC – Ion beam induced charge microscopy
- ICP-AES – Inductively coupled plasma atomic emission spectroscopy
- ICP-MS – Inductively coupled plasma mass spectrometry
- Immunofluorescence
- ICR – Ion cyclotron resonance
- IETS – Inelastic electron tunneling spectroscopy
- IGA – Intelligent gravimetric analysis
- IGF – Inert gas fusion
- IIX – Ion induced X-ray analysis, see particle induced X-ray emission
- INS – Ion neutralization spectroscopy
- Inelastic neutron scattering
- IRNDT – Infrared non-destructive testing of materials
- IRS – Infrared spectroscopy
- ISS – Ion scattering spectroscopy
- ITC – Isothermal titration calorimetry
- IVEM – Intermediate voltage electron microscopy

== L ==
- LALLS – Low-angle laser light scattering
- LC-MS – Liquid chromatography-mass spectrometry
- LEED – Low-energy electron diffraction
- LEEM – Low-energy electron microscopy
- LEIS – Low-energy ion scattering
- LIBS – Laser induced breakdown spectroscopy
- LOES – Laser optical emission spectroscopy
- LS – Light (Raman) scattering

== M ==
- MALDI – Matrix-assisted laser desorption/ionization
- MBE – Molecular beam epitaxy
- MEIS – Medium energy ion scattering
- MFM – Magnetic force microscopy
- MIT – Magnetic induction tomography
- MPM – Multiphoton fluorescence microscopy
- MRFM – Magnetic resonance force microscopy
- MRI – Magnetic resonance imaging
- MS – Mass spectrometry
- MS/MS – Tandem mass spectrometry
- MSGE – Mechanically stimulated gas emission
- Mössbauer spectroscopy
- MTA – Microthermal analysis

== N ==
- NAA – Neutron activation analysis
- ND – Neutron diffraction
- NDP – Neutron depth profiling
- NEXAFS – Near edge X-ray absorption fine structure
- NIS – Nuclear inelastic scattering/absorption
- NMR – Nuclear magnetic resonance spectroscopy
- NOESY – Nuclear Overhauser effect spectroscopy
- NRA – Nuclear reaction analysis
- NSOM – Near-field optical microscopy

== O ==
- OBIC – Optical beam induced current
- ODNMR – Optically detected magnetic resonance, see ESR or EPR
- OES – Optical emission spectroscopy
- Osmometry

== P ==
- PAS – Positron annihilation spectroscopy
- Photoacoustic spectroscopy
- PAT or PACT – Photoacoustic tomography or photoacoustic computed tomography
- PAX – Photoemission of adsorbed xenon
- PC or PCS – Photocurrent spectroscopy
- Phase contrast microscopy
- PhD – Photoelectron diffraction
- PD – Photodesorption
- PDEIS – Potentiodynamic electrochemical impedance spectroscopy
- PDS – Photothermal deflection spectroscopy
- PED – Photoelectron diffraction
- PEELS – parallel electron energy loss spectroscopy
- PEEM – Photoemission electron microscopy (or photoelectron emission microscopy)
- PES – Photoelectron spectroscopy
- PINEM – photon-induced near-field electron microscopy
- PIGE – Particle (or proton) induced gamma-ray spectroscopy, see nuclear reaction analysis
- PIXE – Particle (or proton) induced X-ray spectroscopy
- PL – Photoluminescence
- Porosimetry
- Powder diffraction
- PTMS – Photothermal microspectroscopy
- PTS – Photothermal spectroscopy

== Q ==
- QENS – Quasielastic neutron scattering
- QCM-D – Quartz crystal microbalance with dissipation monitoring

== R ==
- Raman spectroscopy
- RAXRS – Resonant anomalous X-ray scattering
- RBS – Rutherford backscattering spectrometry
- REM – Reflection electron microscopy
- RDS – Reflectance difference spectroscopy
- RHEED – Reflection high energy electron diffraction
- RIMS – Resonance ionization mass spectrometry
- RIXS – Resonant inelastic X-ray scattering
- RR spectroscopy – Resonance Raman spectroscopy

== S ==
- SAD – Selected area diffraction
- SAED – Selected area electron diffraction
- SAM – Scanning Auger microscopy
- SANS – Small angle neutron scattering
- SAXS – Small angle X-ray scattering
- SCANIIR – Surface composition by analysis of neutral species and ion-impact radiation
- SCEM – Scanning confocal electron microscopy
- SE – Spectroscopic ellipsometry
- SEC – Size exclusion chromatography
- SEIRA – Surface enhanced infrared absorption spectroscopy
- SEM – Scanning electron microscopy
- SERS – Surface enhanced Raman spectroscopy
- SERRS – Surface enhanced resonance Raman spectroscopy
- SESANS – Spin Echo Small Angle Neutron Scattering
- SEXAFS – Surface extended X-ray absorption fine structure
- SICM – Scanning ion-conductance microscopy
- SIL – Solid immersion lens
- SIM – Solid immersion mirror
- SIMS – Secondary ion mass spectrometry
- SNMS – Sputtered neutral species mass spectrometry
- SNOM – Scanning near-field optical microscopy
- SPECT – Single-photon emission computed tomography
- SPM – Scanning probe microscopy
- SRM-CE/MS – Selected-reaction-monitoring capillary-electrophoresis mass-spectrometry
- SSNMR – Solid-state nuclear magnetic resonance
- Stark spectroscopy
- STED – Stimulated emission depletion microscopy
- STEM – Scanning transmission electron microscopy
- STM – Scanning tunneling microscopy
- STS – Scanning tunneling spectroscopy
- SXRD – Surface X-ray diffraction

== T ==
- TAT or TACT – Thermoacoustic tomography or thermoacoustic computed tomography (see also photoacoustic tomography – PAT)
- TEM – Transmission electron microscopy
- TGA – Thermogravimetric analysis
- TIKA – Transmitting ion kinetic analysis
- TIMS – Thermal ionization mass spectrometry
- TIRFM – Total internal reflection fluorescence microscopy
- TLS – Photothermal lens spectroscopy, a type of photothermal spectroscopy
- TMA – Thermomechanical analysis
- TOF-MS – Time-of-flight mass spectrometry
- Two-photon excitation microscopy
- TXRF – Total reflection X-ray fluorescence analysis

== U ==
- Ultrasound attenuation spectroscopy
- UPS – UV-photoelectron spectroscopy
- USANS – Ultra small-angle neutron scattering
- USAXS – Ultra small-angle X-ray scattering
- UT – Ultrasonic testing
- UV-Vis – Ultraviolet–visible spectroscopy

== V ==
- VEDIC – Video-enhanced differential interference contrast microscopy
- Voltammetry

== W ==
- WAXS – Wide angle X-ray scattering
- WDX or WDS – Wavelength dispersive X-ray spectroscopy

== X ==
- XAES – X-ray induced Auger electron spectroscopy
- XANES – XANES, synonymous with NEXAFS (near edge X-ray absorption fine structure)
- XAS – X-ray absorption spectroscopy
- X-CTR – X-ray crystal truncation rod scattering
- X-ray crystallography
- XDS – X-ray diffuse scattering
- XES – X-ray emission spectroscopy
- XPEEM – X-ray photoelectron emission microscopy
- XPS – X-ray photoelectron spectroscopy
- XRD – X-ray diffraction
- XRES – X-ray resonant exchange scattering
- XRF – X-ray fluorescence analysis
- XRR – X-ray reflectivity
- XRS – X-ray Raman scattering
- XRT – X-ray transmission
- XSW – X-ray standing wave technique

== See also ==
- Characterization (materials science)
