= Index of physics articles (X) =

The index of physics articles is split into multiple pages due to its size.

To navigate by individual letter use the table of contents below.

== X ==
- X(3872)
- X-ray
- X-ray absorption fine structure
- X-ray absorption spectroscopy
- X-ray astronomy
- X-ray astronomy detector
- X-ray astronomy satellite
- X-ray background
- X-ray binary
- X-ray burster
- X-ray computed tomography
- X-ray crystal truncation rod
- X-ray crystallography
- X-ray filter
- X-ray fluorescence
- X-ray generation
- X-ray generator
- X-ray image intensifier
- X-ray machine
- X-ray magnetic circular dichroism
- X-ray microscope
- X-ray optics
- X-ray photoelectron spectroscopy
- X-ray pulsar
- X-ray reflectivity
- X-ray scattering techniques
- X-ray spectroscopy
- X-ray standing waves
- X-ray telescope
- X-ray tube
- X-wave
- XANES
- XENON Dark Matter Search Experiment
- X (charge)
- X and Y bosons
- X band
- Xallarap
- Xavier Le Pichon
- Xi baryon
- Xiao-Gang Wen
- Xiaowei Zhuang
- Xie Shengwu
- Xie Xide
