= Pennsylvania State University Radiation Science & Engineering Center =

Penn State Breazeale Reactor
- Location in Pennsylvania
- Operating institution: Pennsylvania State University
- Location: University Park, PA
- Coordinates: 40.80401°N 77.85399°W

Construction and upkeep
- Construction began: 1954
- First criticality: August 15, 1955

The Pennsylvania State University (PSU) Radiation Science & Engineering Center (RSEC) houses the Breazeale Nuclear Reactor (BNR). This reactor is the oldest operating in the nation and has undergone numerous power upgrades, renovations, and other changes. The reactor serves the research purposes of the Penn State Department of Nuclear Engineering as well as researchers from industry and other universities. Its total licensed thermal output is 1.1 MW, however the reactor is procedurally limited to 1.0 MW (for 100% operation).

== Reactor overview ==
The BNR first went critical on August 15, 1955 making it the oldest operating reactor in the U.S. Other research reactors predate it but have since been decommissioned such as the first reactor at NC State.

- In 1955 operation began at a rated power of 100 kW.
- In 1960 the power was increased to 200 kW.
- In 1962 and again in 1964 additions of laboratories, hot cells, a Co60 pool, offices, and a classroom were made.
- In 1965 the reactor was upgraded from the plate fuel type with highly enriched MTR fuel to a 1 MW TRIGA core and pin fuel type. Also, enrichment was decreased from 93% to less than 20%, making the core classified as LEU. The design also allowed pulsing capabilities of up to 2000 MW. This pulse power level can be varied, and pulse length is approximately 250 ms.
- In 1986 the license for the reactor was renewed for another 20 years.
- In 2009 the license for the reactor was renewed for another 20 years.

In 1999 54 faculty and staff, 27 graduate students, and 30 undergraduate students performed research at the facility, and nine master's theses and five doctoral dissertations were completed. Every year around 3,000 people participate in tours or other activities.

== Overview ==
The mission of the reactor is defined as outreach, education, research and service. First and foremost there is a commitment to ensure the safety of the public with an emphasis on education. To achieve this, the reactor maintains an open atmosphere. An 'open house' is given in tandem with the College of Engineering at Penn State (usually the 3rd to 5th week in the Fall Semester) in which members of the public are given access to the facility to observe reactor operations, ask questions and seek answers. There is a firm belief in "atoms for peace" as defined by President Dwight Eisenhower.

== Research and irradiation facilities ==
Neutron activation analysis (NAA) has been practised for decades here in various forms. Currently, graduate student programs are constructed using this technology. This is a sub-parts-per-million compositional analysis technique that is comparable to modern mass-spectrometry systems.

Neutron radiography uses the beam port facilities to image materials (similar to x-ray techniques) but has advantages when using hydrogen-bearing materials (e.g. water or plastics) as this is not effective for x-ray imaging. This has been used extensively over the years but now is focused research work for the Penn State Fuel Cell Project for the Department of Mechanical and Nuclear Engineering at Penn State.

Neutron depth profiling (NDP) is a technique for analysis of composition and density that is well suited for semiconductor film characterization.
