= XRR =

XRR or xrr may refer to:

- X-ray reflectivity, a surface-sensitive analytical technique used to characterize surfaces, thin films and multilayers
- XRR, the IATA code for Ross River Airport, Yukon, Canada
- xrr, the ISO 639-3 code for Rhaetic, Eastern Alps
