= Michael Bedzyk =

American physicist

Michael J. Bedzyk
- Known for: x-ray physicist developing the understanding of X-ray standing waves
- Awards: Bertram Eugene Warren Diffraction Physics Award, American Crystallographic Association (1994); Fellow of American Physical Society (1998); Fellow of American Association for the Advancement of Science (2012)
- Scientific career
- Fields: physics
- Workplaces: Northwestern University

Michael J. Bedzyk is an x-ray physicist, Professor of Materials Science and Engineering at Northwestern University.

== Biography ==
His research program includes the development of novel X-ray probes and the characterization of surface, interface, and thin-film structures with atomic resolution. He conducts experiments using both in-house and synchrotron X-ray facilities. The latter have greatly enhanced chemical and structural sensitivity for studying systems as dilute as one-hundredth of an atomic monolayer.

He also developed a number of methods for generating X-ray standing waves with differing characteristic length scales. He uses these periodic X-ray probes to pinpoint the lattice location of adsorbate atoms on crystalline surfaces, to measure strain within epitaxially grown semiconductor and ferroelectric thin films, and to locate heavy atoms within ordered ultrathin organic films.

== Awards and significant honors ==
- Fellow, American Association for the Advancement of Science, 2012
- Fellow, American Physical Society, 1998
- Bertram Eugene Warren Diffraction Physics Award, American Crystallographic Association, 1994

== Education ==
Bedzyk received his bachelor's, M.S., and PhD degrees all from State University of New York at Albany. His PhD thesis was titled "X-ray standing wave analysis for bromine chemisorbed on silicon."
