= Grazing incidence diffraction =

Diffraction using small incidence angles

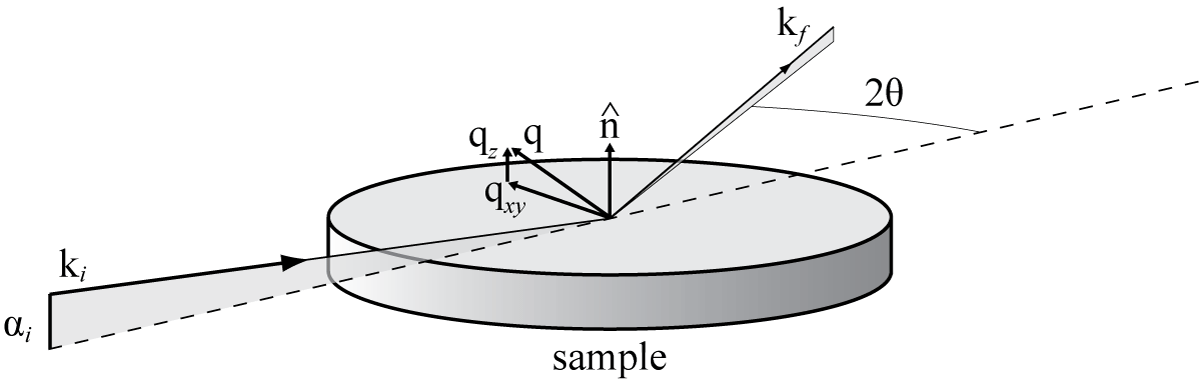
Grazing incidence diffraction geometry. The angle of incidence, α, is close to the critical angle for the sample. The beam is diffracted in the plane of the surface of the sample by the angle 2θ, and often also out of the plane.

Grazing incidence diffraction (GID) is a technique for interrogating a material using small incidence angles for an incoming wave, often leading to the diffraction being surface sensitive. It occurs in many different areas:

- Reflection high-energy electron diffraction (RHEED), where electrons of relatively high energy diffract at small angles from a surface. RHEED is used to interrogate surface structure.
- Surface X-ray diffraction (SXRD), which is similar to RHEED but uses X-rays, and is also used to interrogate surface structure.
- X-ray standing waves, another X-ray variant where the intensity decay into a sample from diffraction is used to analyze chemistry.
- Grazing-incidence small-angle scattering (GISAS) a hybrid approach using small scattering (diffraction) angles with X-rays or neutrons.
- X-ray reflectivity, yet another related technique, but here the intensity of the specular reflected beam is measured.
- Grazing incidence atom scattering, where the fact that atoms (and ions) can also be waves is used to diffract from surfaces.
- Quantum reflection, where very low kinetic energy atoms or molecules are diffracted (reflected) from surfaces.
- Evanescent waves, which occur with all of the above and also photons where there is no flow of energy into the material.

More details and citations on these can be found in the links provided above.

== See also ==
- X-ray diffraction
- Neutron scattering
- Electron diffraction
