= Coking =

Heating of coal in the absence of oxygen

Coking is the process of heating coal in the absence of oxygen to a temperature above 600 °C (1,112 °F) to drive off the volatile components of the raw coal, leaving behind a hard, strong, porous material with a high carbon content called coke. Coke is predominantly carbon. Its porous structure provides a high surface area, allowing it to burn more rapidly, much like how a bundle of tinder burns faster than a solid wooden log. As such, when a kilogram (2.2 lbs) of coke is burned, it releases more heat than a kilogram of the original coal.

== Application to smelting iron ==
Coke is used as fuel in a blast furnace. In a continuous process, coke, iron ore, and limestone are mixed together and placed in the top of the blast furnace, and at the bottom liquid iron and waste slag are removed. The raw materials continuously move down the blast furnace. During this continuous process more raw materials are placed at the top, and as the coke moves down, it must withstand the ever-increasing weight of the materials above it. It is the ability to withstand this crushing force, in addition to its high energy content and rapid combustion, that makes coke ideal for use in blast furnaces.

== Petroleum coking ==
"Coking is a refinery unit operation that upgrades material called bottoms from the atmospheric or vacuum distillation column into higher-value products and produces petroleum coke—a coal-like material". In heterogeneous catalysis, the process is undesirable because the clinker blocks the catalytic sites. Coking is characteristic of high temperature reactions involving hydrocarbon feedstocks. Typically coking is reversed by combustion, provided that the catalyst will tolerate such.

A simplified equation for coking is shown in the case of ethylene:

3 C_{2}H_{4} → 2 C ("coke") + 2 C_{2}H_{6}

A more realistic but complex view involves the alkylation of an aromatic ring of a coke nucleus. Acidic catalysts are thus especially prone to coking because they are effective at generating carbocations (i.e., alkylating agents).

Coking is one of several mechanisms for the deactivation of a heterogeneous catalyst. Other mechanisms include sintering, poisoning, and solid-state transformation of the catalyst.

== See also ==
- Coking factory
- Gas to liquids
