= X-ray standing waves =

The X-ray standing wave (XSW) technique can be used to study the structure of surfaces and interfaces with high spatial resolution and chemical selectivity. Pioneered by B.W. Batterman in the 1960s, the availability of synchrotron light has stimulated the application of this interferometric technique to a wide range of problems in surface science.

== Basic principles ==
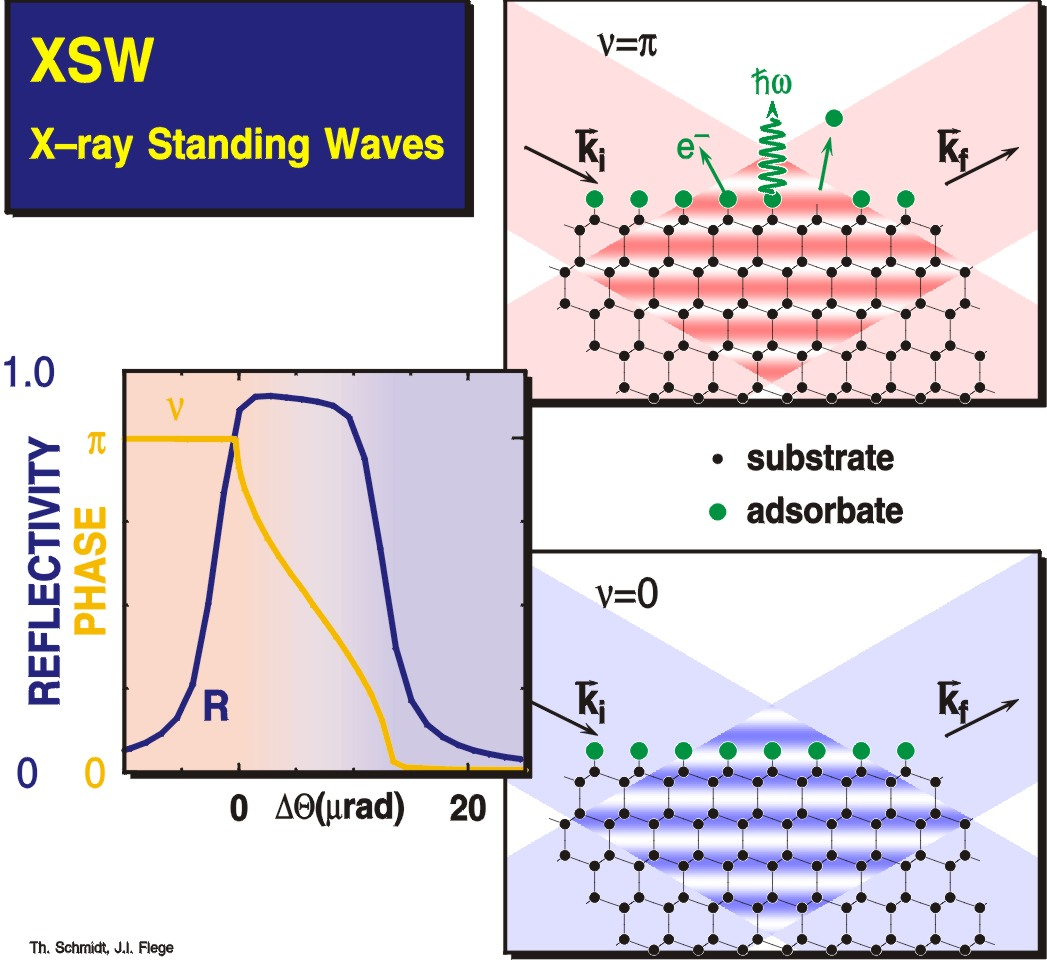
Principle of X-ray standing wave measurements

An X-ray standing wave (XSW) field is created by interference between an X-ray beam impinging on a sample and a reflected beam. The reflection may be generated at the Bragg condition for a crystal lattice or an engineered multilayer superlattice; in these cases, the period of the XSW equals the periodicity of the reflecting planes. X-ray reflectivity from a mirror surface at small incidence angles may also be used to generate long-period XSWs.

The spatial modulation of the XSW field, described by the dynamical theory of X-ray diffraction, undergoes a pronounced change when the sample is scanned through the Bragg condition. Due to a relative phase variation between the incoming and reflected beams, the nodal planes of the XSW field shift by half the XSW period. Depending on the position of the atoms within this wave field, the measured element-specific absorption of X-rays varies in a characteristic way. Therefore, measurement of the absorption (via X-ray fluorescence or photoelectron yield) can reveal the position of the atoms relative to the reflecting planes. The absorbing atoms can be thought of as "detecting" the phase of the XSW; thus, this method overcomes the phase problem of X-ray crystallography.

For quantitative analysis, the normalized fluorescence or photoelectron yield $Y_p$ is described by

$Y_{p}(\Omega) = 1 + R + 2C \sqrt{R} f_H \cos (\nu - 2\pi P_H )$,

where $R$ is the reflectivity and $\nu$ is the relative phase of the interfering beams. The characteristic shape of $Y_p$ can be used to derive precise structural information about the surface atoms because the two parameters $f_H$ (coherent fraction) and $P_H$ (coherent position) are directly related to the Fourier representation of the atomic distribution function. Therefore, with a sufficiently large number of Fourier components being measured, XSW data can be used to establish the distribution of the different atoms in the unit cell (XSW imaging).

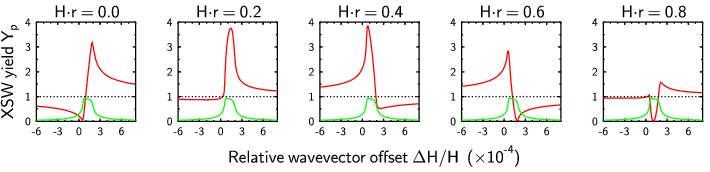
Characteristic XSW yield (red lines) through the $\mathbf{H}=hkl$ Bragg condition for an absorbing atom at position $P_H = \mathbf{H}\cdot\mathbf{r}$. The Bragg reflection, calculated by dynamical diffraction theory, is shown in green.

== Experimental considerations ==
XSW measurements of single crystal surfaces are performed on a diffractometer. The crystal is rocked through a Bragg diffraction condition, and the reflectivity and XSW yield are simultaneously measured. XSW yield is usually detected as X-ray fluorescence (XRF). XRF detection enables in situ measurements of interfaces between a surface and gas or liquid environments, since hard X-rays can penetrate these media. While XRF gives an element-specific XSW yield, it is not sensitive to the chemical state of the absorbing atom. Chemical state sensitivity is achieved using photoelectron detection, which requires ultra-high vacuum instrumentation.

Measurements of atomic positions at or near single crystal surfaces require substrates of very high crystal quality. The intrinsic width of a Bragg reflection, as calculated by dynamical diffraction theory, is extremely small (on the order of 0.001° under conventional X-ray diffraction conditions). Crystal defects such as mosaicity can substantially broaden the measured reflectivity, which obscures the modulations in the XSW yield needed to locate the absorbing atom. For defect-rich substrates such as metal single crystals, a normal-incidence or back-reflection geometry is used. In this geometry, the intrinsic width of the Bragg reflection is maximized. Instead of rocking the crystal in space, the energy of the incident beam is tuned through the Bragg condition. Since this geometry requires soft incident X-rays, this geometry typically uses XPS detection of the XSW yield.

== Selected applications ==
Applications which require ultra-high vacuum conditions:

- Physisorption and chemisorption studies
- Diffusion of dopants in crystals
- Superlattices and Quasi-crystal characterization

Applications which do not require ultra-high vacuum conditions:

- Langmuir-Blodgett films
- Self-assembled monolayers
- Model heterogeneous catalysts
- Buried interfaces

== See also ==
- List of surface analysis methods
