= Temperature-programmed reduction =

Temperature-programmed reduction is a technique for the characterization of solid materials and is often used in the field of heterogeneous catalysis to find the most efficient reduction conditions, an oxidized catalyst precursor is submitted to a programmed temperature rise while a reducing gas mixture is flowed over it. It was developed by John Ward Jenkins whilst developing heterogeneous catalysts for Shell Oil company, but was never patented.

== Process description ==
A simple container (U-tube) is filled with a solid or catalyst. This sample vessel is positioned in a furnace with temperature control equipment. A thermocouple is placed in the solid for temperature measurement. The air originally present in the container is flushed out with an inert gas (nitrogen, argon). Flow controllers are used to add hydrogen (for example, 10% hydrogen in nitrogen). The composition of the gaseous mixture is measured at the exit of the sample container with appropriate detectors (thermal conductivity detector, mass spectrometer). Now, the sample in the oven is heated up on predefined values. Heating rates are usually between 1 K/min and 20 K/min. If a reduction takes place at a certain temperature, hydrogen is consumed, which is recorded by the detector. In practice the production of water is a more accurate way of measuring the reduction. This is due to the potential for varying hydrogen concentrations at the inlet, so the decrease in this number may not be precise, however as the starting concentration of water will be zero, any increase can be measured more accurately.

== See also ==
- Thermal desorption spectroscopy
