= Mechanically stimulated gas emission =

Phenomenon where a solid can emit gases

Mechanically stimulated gas emission (MSGE) is a complex phenomenon embracing various physical and chemical processes occurring on the surface and in the bulk of a solid under applied mechanical stress and resulting in emission of gases. MSGE is a part of a more general phenomenon of mechanically stimulated neutral emission. MSGE experiments are often performed in ultra-high vacuum.

== Phenomenology ==
The specific characteristics of MSGE as compared with MSNE is that the emitted neutral particles are limited to gas molecules. MSGE is opposite to Mechanically Stimulated Gas Absorption that usually occurs under fretting corrosion of metals, exposure to gases at high pressures, etc.

There are three main sources of MSGE:

I. Gas molecules adsorbed on the surface of a solid
IIa. Gases dissolved in the material bulk
IIb. Gases occluded or trapped in micro- and nanovoids, discontinuities and on defects in the material bulk
III. Gases generated as a result of mechanical activation of chemical reactions.

Generally, for producing MSGE, the mechanical action on the solid can be of any type including tension, compression, torsion, shearing, rubbing, fretting, rolling, indentation, etc. In previous studies carried out by various groups it was found that MSGE is associated mainly with plastic deformation, fracture, wear and other irreversible modifications of a solid. Under elastic deformation MSGE is almost negligible and only was observed just below elastic limit due to possible microplastic deformation.

In accordance to the main sources, the emitted gases usually contain hydrogen (source type IIa), argon (for coatings obtained using PVD in Ar plasma - source type IIb), methane (source type III), water (source type I and/or III), carbon mono- and dioxide (source type I/III).

The knowledge on the mechanisms of MSGE is still vague. On the basis of the experimental findings it was speculated that the following processes can be related with MSGE:

1. Transport of gas atoms by moving dislocations
2. Gas diffusion in the bulk driven by gradient of mechanical stress
3. Phase transformation induced by deformation
4. Removal of oxide and other surface layers, which prevent exit of dissolved atoms on the surface
5. Extension of free surface

Thermal effect seems to be irrelevant to the gas emission under light load conditions.

== Terminology ==
Emerging character of this interdisciplinary branch of science is reflected by a lack of established terminology. There are different terms and definitions used by different authors depending on the main approach used (chemical, physical, mechanical, vacuum science, etc.), specific gas emission mechanism (desorption, emanation, emission, etc.) and type of mechanical activation (friction, traction, etc.):

Mechanically stimulated outgassing (MSO)
Tribodesorption
Triboemission,
Fractoemission
Atomic and Molecular emission
Outgassing stimulated by friction
Outgassing stimulated by deformation

Desorption (tribodesorption, fractodesorption, etc.) refers to release of gases dissolved in the bulk and adsorbed on the surface. Therefore, desorption is only one of the contributing processes to MSGE. Outgassing is a technical term usually utilized in vacuum science. Thus, the term "gas emission" embraces various processes, reflects the physical nature of this complex phenomenon and is preferable for use in scientific publications.

== Experimental observations ==
Due to low emission rate experiments should be performed in ultrahigh vacuum (UHV). In some studies the materials were previously doped with tritium. MSGE rate then was measured by radioactivity outcome from the material under applied mechanical stress.

== See also ==
- Mechanochemistry
