= Appearance energy =

Appearance energy (also known as appearance potential) is the minimum energy that must be supplied to a gas phase atom or molecule in order to produce an ion. In mass spectrometry, it is accounted as the voltage to correspond for electron ionization. This is the minimum electron energy that produces an ion. In photoionization, it is the minimum photon energy of a photon that produces some ion signal. For example, the indene bromide ion (IndBr+) only loses bromine at an incident photon energy of 10.2 eV, so the product, indenyl, has an appearance energy of 10.2 eV.

== See also ==
- Ionization energy
