= Reflectance difference spectroscopy =

Reflectance difference spectroscopy (RDS) is a spectroscopic technique which measures the difference in reflectance of two beams of light that are shone in normal incident on a surface with different linear polarizations. It is also known as reflectance anisotropy spectroscopy (RAS).

It is calculated as:

$$RDS= 2 \frac{r_{\alpha}-r_{\beta}}{r_{\alpha}+r_{\beta}}, r \in \mathbb{C}$$

$r_{\alpha}$ and $r_{\beta}$ are the reflectance in two different polarizations.

The method was introduced in 1985 for the study optical properties of the cubic semiconductors silicon and germanium. Due to its high surface sensitivity and independence of ultra-high vacuum, its use has been expanded to in situ monitoring of epitaxial growth or the interaction of surfaces with adsorbates. To assign specific features in the signal to their origin in morphology and electronic structure, theoretical modelling by density functional theory is required.
