= Thermal desorption spectroscopy =

Method for observing interactions between molecules and surfaces

Temperature programmed desorption (TPD) is the method of observing desorbed molecules from a surface when the surface temperature is increased. When experiments are performed using well-defined surfaces of single-crystalline samples in a continuously pumped ultra-high vacuum (UHV) chamber, then this experimental technique is often also referred to as thermal desorption spectroscopy or thermal desorption spectrometry (TDS).

== Desorption ==
When molecules or atoms come in contact with a surface, they adsorb onto it, minimizing their energy by forming a bond with the surface. The binding energy varies with the combination of the adsorbate and surface. If the surface is heated, at one point, the energy transferred to the adsorbed species will cause it to desorb. The temperature at which this happens is known as the desorption temperature. Thus TPD shows information on the binding energy.

== Measurement ==
Since TPD observes the mass of desorbed molecules, it shows what molecules are adsorbed on the surface. Moreover, TPD recognizes the different adsorption conditions of the same molecule from the differences between the desorption temperatures of molecules desorbing different sites at the surface, e.g. terraces vs. steps. TPD also obtains the amounts of adsorbed molecules on the surface from the intensity of the peaks of the TPD spectrum, and the total amount of adsorbed species is shown by the integral of the spectrum.

To measure TPD, one needs a mass spectrometer, such as a quadrupole mass spectrometer or a time-of-flight (TOF) mass spectrometer, under ultrahigh vacuum (UHV) conditions. The amount of adsorbed molecules is measured by increasing the temperature at a heating rate of typically 2 K/s to 10 K/s. Several masses may be simultaneously measured by the mass spectrometer, and the intensity of each mass as a function of temperature is obtained as a TDS spectrum.

The heating procedure is often controlled by the PID control algorithm, with the controller being either a computer or specialised equipment such as a Eurotherm.

Other methods of measuring desorption are Thermal Gravimetric Analysis (TGA) or using infrared detectors, thermal conductivity detectors etc.

== Quantitative interpretation of TPD data ==
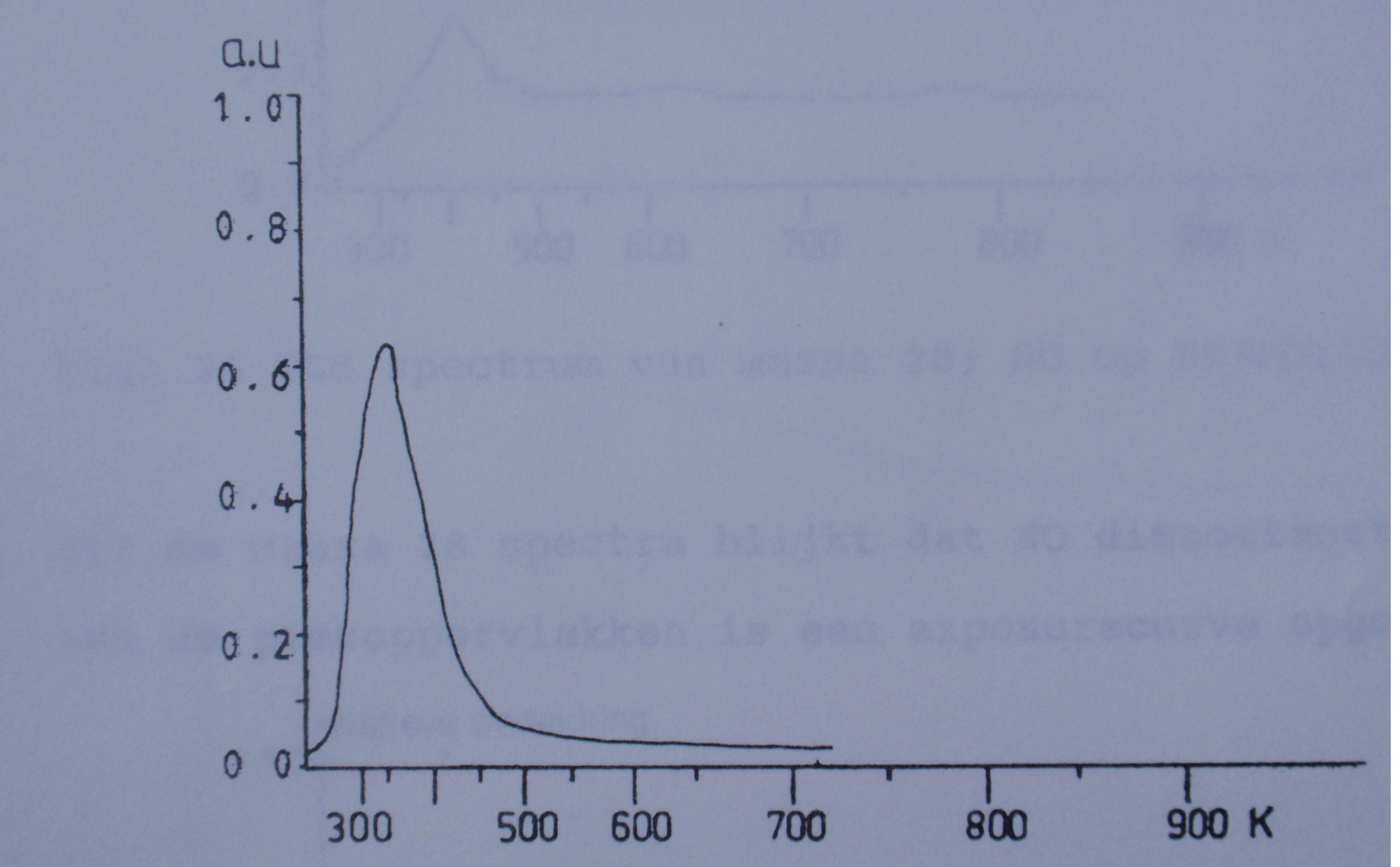
TDS Spectrum 1 A thermal desorption spectrum of NO absorbed on platinum-rhodium (100) single crystal. The x axis is temperature in kelvins, the unit of the y axis is arbitrary, in fact the intensity of a mass-spectrometer measurement.

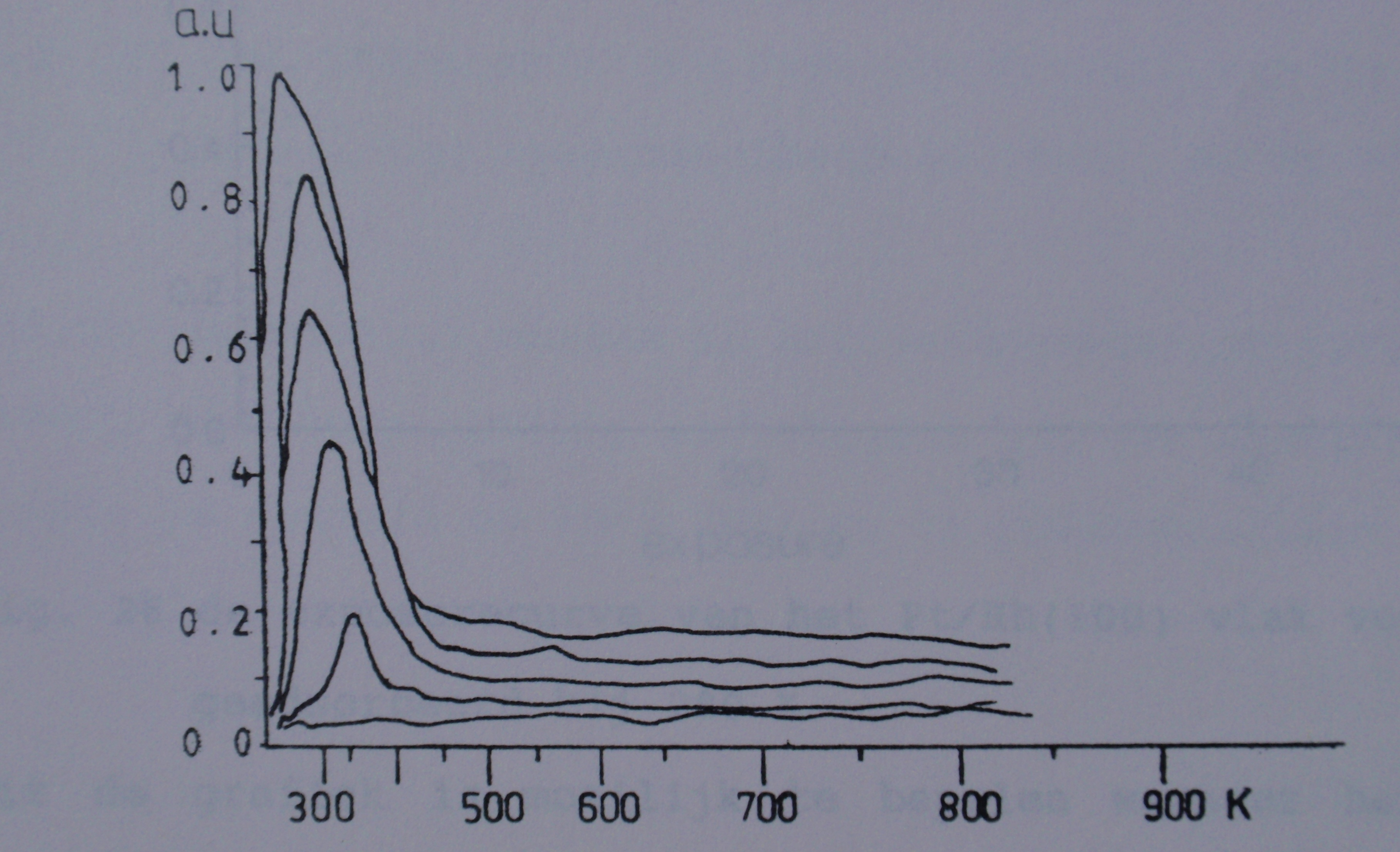
TDS Spectrum 2 A thermal desorption spectrum of NO absorbed on platinum-rhodium (100) single crystal. The spectra of several NO coverages are combined in one spectrum. The x axis is temperature in kelvins, the unit of the y axis is arbitrary, in fact the intensity of a mass-spectrometer measurement.

TDS spectrum 1 and 2 are typical examples of a TPD measurement. Both are examples of NO desorbing from a single crystal in high vacuum. The crystal was mounted on a titanium filament and heated with current. The desorbing NO was measured using a mass spectrometer monitoring the atomic mass of 30.

Before 1990 analysis of a TPD spectrum was usually done using a so-called simplified method; the "Redhead" method, assuming the exponential prefactor and the desorption energy to be independent of the surface coverage. After 1990 and with use of computer algorithms TDS spectra were analyzed using the "complete analysis method" or the "leading edge method". These methods assume the exponential prefactor and the desorption energy to be dependent of the surface coverage. Several available methods of analyzing TDS are described and compared in an article by A.M. de JONG and J.W. NIEMANTSVERDRIET. During parameter optimization/estimation, using the integral has been found to create a more well behaved objective function than the differential.

== Theoretical Introduction ==
Thermal desorption is described by the Polanyi–Wigner equation derived from the Arrhenius equation.

$$r(\sigma) = -\frac{\mathrm{d}\sigma}{\mathrm{d}t} = v(\sigma) \sigma^n e^{-E_\text{act}(\sigma)/RT},$$

where

$r(\sigma)$ the desorption rate [mol/(cm^{2} s)] as a function of $\sigma$,
$n$ order of desorption,
$\sigma$ surface coverage,
$v(\sigma)$ pre-exponential factor [Hz] as a function of $\sigma$,
$E_\text{act}(\sigma)$ activation energy of desorption [kJ/mol] as a function of $\sigma$,
$R$ gas constant [J/(K mol)],
$T$ temperature [K].

This equation is difficult in practice while several variables are a function of the coverage and influence each other. The “complete analysis method” calculates the pre-exponential factor and the activation energy at several coverages. This calculation can be simplified. First we assume the pre-exponential factor and the activation energy to be independent of the coverage.

We also assume a linear heating rate:
(equation 1)

$$T(t) = T_0 + (\beta t),$$

where:

$\beta$ the heating rate in [K/s],
$T_0$ the start temperature in [K],
$t$ the time in [s].

We assume that the pump rate of the system is indefinitely large, thus no gasses will absorb during the desorption. The change in pressure during desorption is described as:
(equation 2)

$$\frac{\mathrm{d}P}{\mathrm{d}t} + P/\alpha = \frac{\mathrm{d}(a\,r(t))}{\mathrm{d}t},$$

where:

$P$ the pressure in the system,
$t$ the time in [s].
$$a = A/KV$$,
$A$ the sample surface [m^{2}],
$K$ a constant,
$V$ volume of the system [m^{3}],
$r(t)$ the desorption rate [mol/(cm^{2} s)],
$$\alpha = V/S$$,
$S$ the pump rate,
$V$ volume of the system [m^{3}],

We assume that $S$ is indefinitely large so molecules do not re-adsorp during desorption process and we assume that $P/\alpha$ is indefinitely small compared to $\frac{\mathrm{d}P}{\mathrm{d}t}$ and thus:
(equation 3)

$$a\,r(t) = \frac{\mathrm{d}P}{\mathrm{d}t}.$$

Equation 2 and 3 lead to conclude that the desorption rate is a function of the change in pressure. One can use data in an experiment, which are a function of the pressure like the intensity of a mass spectrometer, to determine the desorption rate.

Since we assumed the pre-exponential factor and the activation energy to be independent of the coverage. Thermal desorption is described with a simplified Arrhenius equation:
(equation 4)

$$r(t) = -\frac{\mathrm{d}\sigma}{\mathrm{d}t} = v_n \sigma^n e^{-E_{\mathrm{act}}/RT},$$

where:

$r(t)$ the desorption rate[mol/(cm^{2} s)],
$n$ order of desorption,
$\sigma$ surface coverage,
$v_n$ pre-exponential factor [Hz],
$E_\text{act}$ activation energy of desorption [kJ/mol],
$R$ gas constant,
$T$ temperature [K].

Using the before mentioned Redhead method (a method less precise as the "complete analysis" or the "leading edge" method) and the temperature maximum $T_m$ one can determine the activation energy:
(equation 5)
for n=1

$$E_\text{act}/{RT_m}^2 = v_1/\beta e^{-E_\text{act}/RT_m},$$

(equation 6)
for n=2

$$E_\text{act}/{RT_m}^2 = \sigma_0 v_2/\beta e^{-E_{\mathrm{act}}/RT_m}.$$

M. Ehasi and K. Christmann described a simple method to determine the activation energy of the second order. Equation 6 can be changed into:
(equation 6a)

$$\ln(\sigma_0 {T_m}^2) = -E_\text{act}/RT + \ln({\beta - E_\text{act}/v_2R}),$$

where: $\sigma_0$ is the surface area of a TDS or TPD peak.

A graph of $\ln(\sigma_0 {T_m}^2)$ versus $1/T_m$ results in a straight line with a slope equal to $-E_\text{act}/R$.

Thus in a first-order reaction the $T_m$ is independent of the surface coverage. Changing the surface coverage one can determine $n$. Usually a fixed value of the pre-exponential factor is used and is $\beta$ known, with these values one can derive the $E_\text{act}$ iteratively from $T_m$.

== See also ==
- Temperature-programmed reduction
