= Neutron depth profiling =

Neutron depth profiling (NDP) is a near-surface analysis technique that is commonly used to obtain profiles of concentration as a function of depth for certain technologically important light elements in nearly any substrate. The technique was first proposed by Ziegler et al. to determine the concentration profiles of boron impurities in silicon substrates, and later improved by Biersack and coworkers to much of its existing capabilities.

== Neutron depth profiling ==
In NDP, a thermal or cold neutron beam passes through a material and interacts with isotopes that emit monoenergetic charged particles upon neutron absorption; either a proton or an alpha, and a recoil nucleus. Since the charged particles are equally likely to be emitted in any direction, reaction kinematics are straightforward. Because low-energy neutrons are used, there is no significant momentum transfer from the neutron beam to the substrate, and the analysis is practically non-destructive. As charged particles move towards the surface, they are rapidly slowed down, primarily by interacting with the electrons of the substrate. The amount of energy loss is directly related to the thickness penetrated by the particle. The depth of the reaction site can be found by stopping power correlations.

== Profiling ==
Conventionally, the residual energies of charged particles and recoil nuclei have been measured by a silicon charged-particle detector; most commonly either a surface barrier detector (SBD) or a passivated implanted planar silicon (PIPS) detector. In this configuration, the semiconductor detector is placed opposite to the surface of the sample being analyzed, and an energy spectrum of charged particles emitted by the neutron-induced reaction is acquired.

== See also ==
- Neutron activation
