= X-ray crystal truncation rod =

X-ray crystal truncation rod scattering is a powerful method in surface science, based on analysis of surface X-ray diffraction (SXRD) patterns from a crystalline surface.

For an infinite crystal, the diffracted pattern is concentrated in Dirac delta function like Bragg peaks. Presence of crystalline surfaces results in additional structure along so-called truncation rods (linear regions in momentum space normal to the surface). Crystal Truncation Rod (CTR) measurements allow detailed determination of atomic structure at the surface, especially useful in cases of oxidation, epitaxial growth, and adsorption studies on crystalline surfaces.

== Theory ==
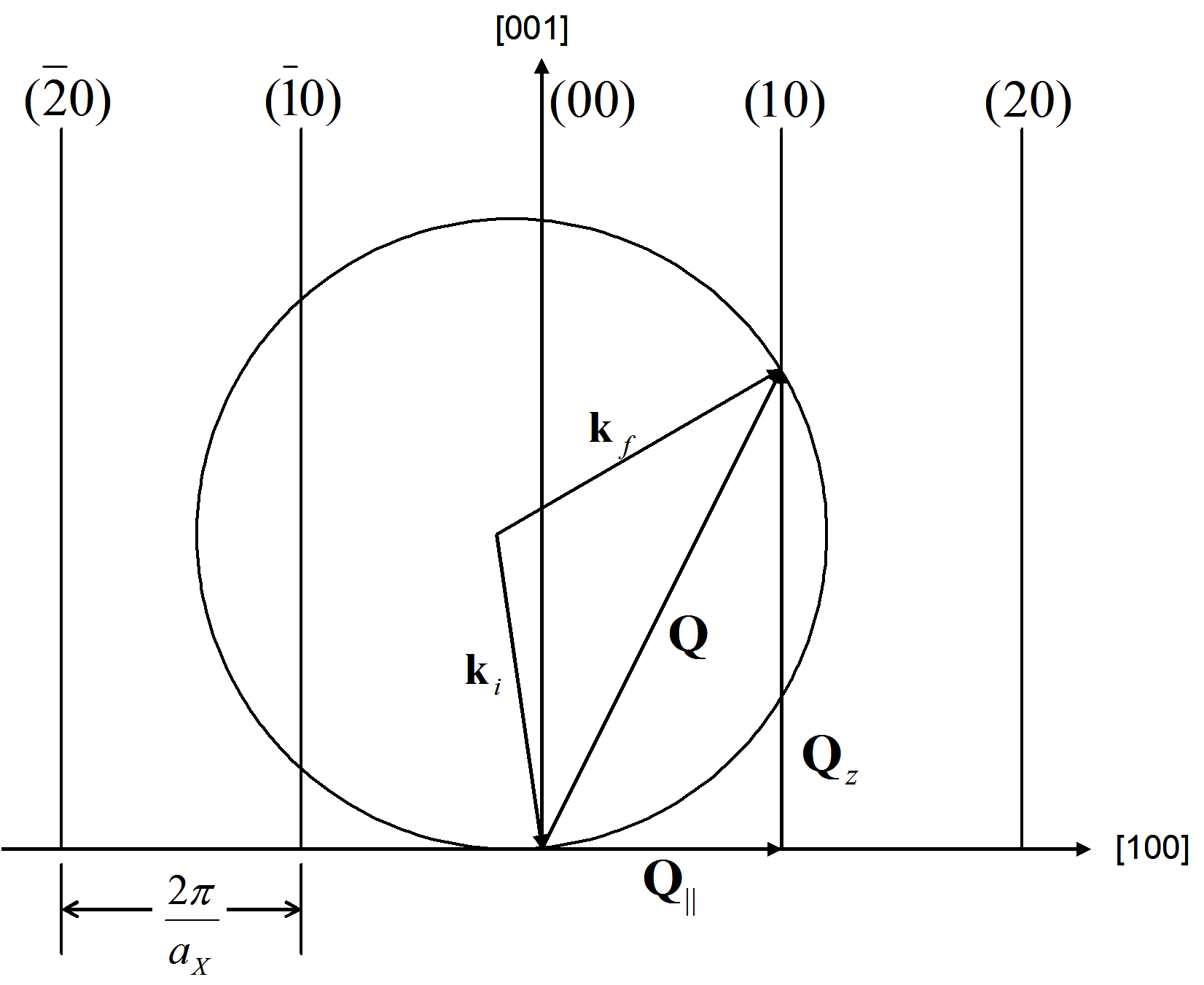
Fig. 1: Crystal Truncation Rods produced by a simple cubic lattice with ideal termination

A particle incident on a crystalline surface with momentum $K_0$ will undergo scattering through a momentum change of $\mathbf{Q}$. If $x$ and $y$ represent directions in the plane of the surface and $z$ is perpendicular to the surface, then the scattered intensity as a function of all possible values of $\mathbf{Q}$ is given by

$I(\mathbf{Q})=\frac{\sin^2 \left ( \tfrac{1}{2}N_xQ_xa_x \right )}{\sin^2\left (\tfrac{1}{2}Q_xa_x\right )}\ \frac{\sin^2 \left (\tfrac{1}{2}N_yQ_ya_y \right )}{\sin^2 \left (\tfrac{1}{2}Q_ya_y \right )}\ \frac{1+\alpha^{2N_z}-2\alpha^{N_z} \cos \left (N_zQ_zc \right )}{1+\alpha^2-2\alpha \cos \left (Q_zc \right )}$

Where $\alpha$ is the penetration coefficient, defined as the ratio of x-ray amplitudes scattered from successive planes of atoms in the crystal, and $a_x$, $a_y$, and $c$ are the lattice spacings in the x, y, and z directions, respectively.

In the case of perfect absorption, $\alpha = 0$, and the intensity becomes independent of $Q_z$, with a maximum for any $\mathbf{Q_{\parallel}}$ (the component of $\mathbf{Q}$ parallel to the crystal surface) that satisfies the 2D Laue condition in reciprocal space

$\mathbf{Q}_\parallel = \mathbf{G}_{hk} = h\mathbf{a}^*_x + k\mathbf{a}^*_y$

for integers $h$ and $k$. This condition results in rods of intensity in reciprocal space, oriented perpendicular to the surface and passing through the reciprocal lattice points of the surface, as in Fig. 1. These rods are known as diffraction rods, or crystal truncation rods.

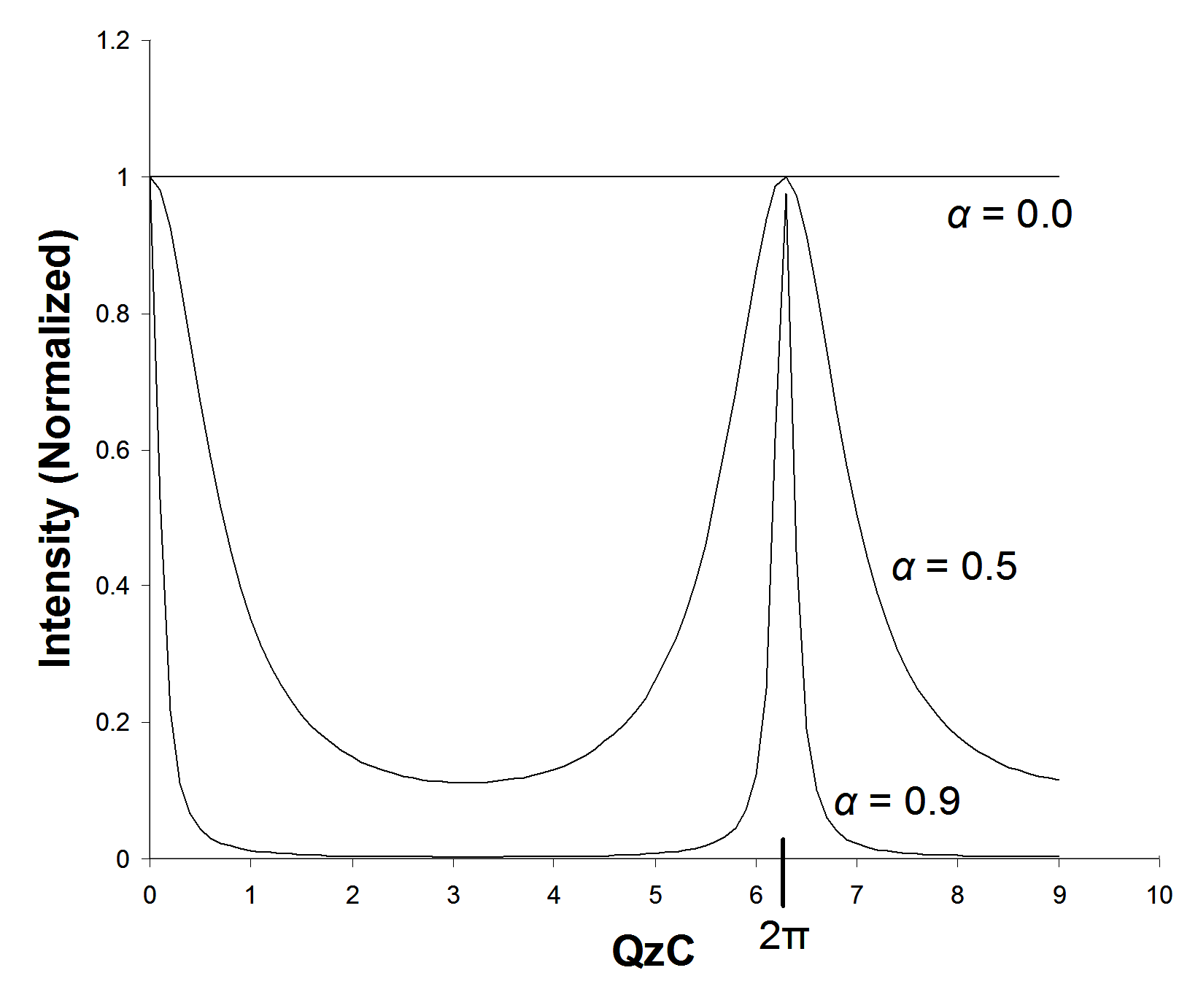
Fig. 2: Intensity variation along a Crystal Truncation Rod from a simple cubic lattice

When $\alpha$ is allowed to vary from 0, the intensity along the rods varies according to Fig. 2. Note that in the limit as $\alpha$ approaches unity, the x-rays are fully penetrating, and the scattered intensity approaches a periodic delta function, as in bulk diffraction.

This calculation has been done according to the kinematic (single-scattering) approximation. This has been shown to be accurate to within a factor of $10^{-7}$ of the peak intensity. Adding dynamical (multiple-scattering) considerations to the model can result in even more accurate predictions of CTR intensity.

== Instrumentation ==
To obtain high-quality data in X-ray CTR measurements, it is desirable that the detected intensity be on the order of at least $10^9 \tfrac{photons}{mm^2s}$. To achieve this level of output, the X-ray source must typically be a synchrotron source. More traditional, inexpensive sources such as rotating anode sources provide 2-3 orders of magnitude less X-ray flux and are only suitable for studying high-atomic number materials, which return a higher diffracted intensity. The maximum diffracted intensity is roughly proportional to the square of the atomic number, $Z$. Anode X-ray sources have been successfully used to study gold ($Z=79$) for example.

When doing X-ray measurements of a surface, the sample is held in Ultra-High Vacuum and the X-rays pass into and out of the UHV chamber through Beryllium windows. There are 2 approaches to chamber and diffractometer design that are in use. In the first method, the sample is fixed relative to the vacuum chamber, which is kept as small and light as possible and mounted on the diffractometer. In the second method, the sample is rotated within the chamber by bellows coupled to the outside. This approach avoids putting a large mechanical load on the diffractometer goniometer, making it easier to maintain fine angular resolution. One drawback of many configurations is that the sample must be moved in order to use other surface analysis methods such as LEED or AES, and after moving the sample back into the X-ray diffraction position, it must be realigned. In some setups, the sample chamber can be detached from the diffractometer without breaking vacuum, allowing for other users to have access. For examples of X-ray CTR diffractometer apparatus, see refs 15–17 in

== CTR Rodscans ==
For a given incidence angle of X-rays onto a surface, only the intersections of the crystal truncation rods with the Ewald sphere can be observed. To measure the intensity along a CTR, the sample must be rotated in the X-ray beam so that the origin of the Ewald sphere is translated and the sphere intersects the rod at a different location in reciprocal space. Performing a rodscan in this way requires accurate coordinated motion of the sample and the detector along different axes. To achieve this motion, the sample and detector are mounted in an apparatus called a four-circle diffractometer. The sample is rotated in the plane bisecting the incoming and diffracted beam and the detector is moved into the position necessary to capture the diffracted CTR intensity.

== Surface Structures ==
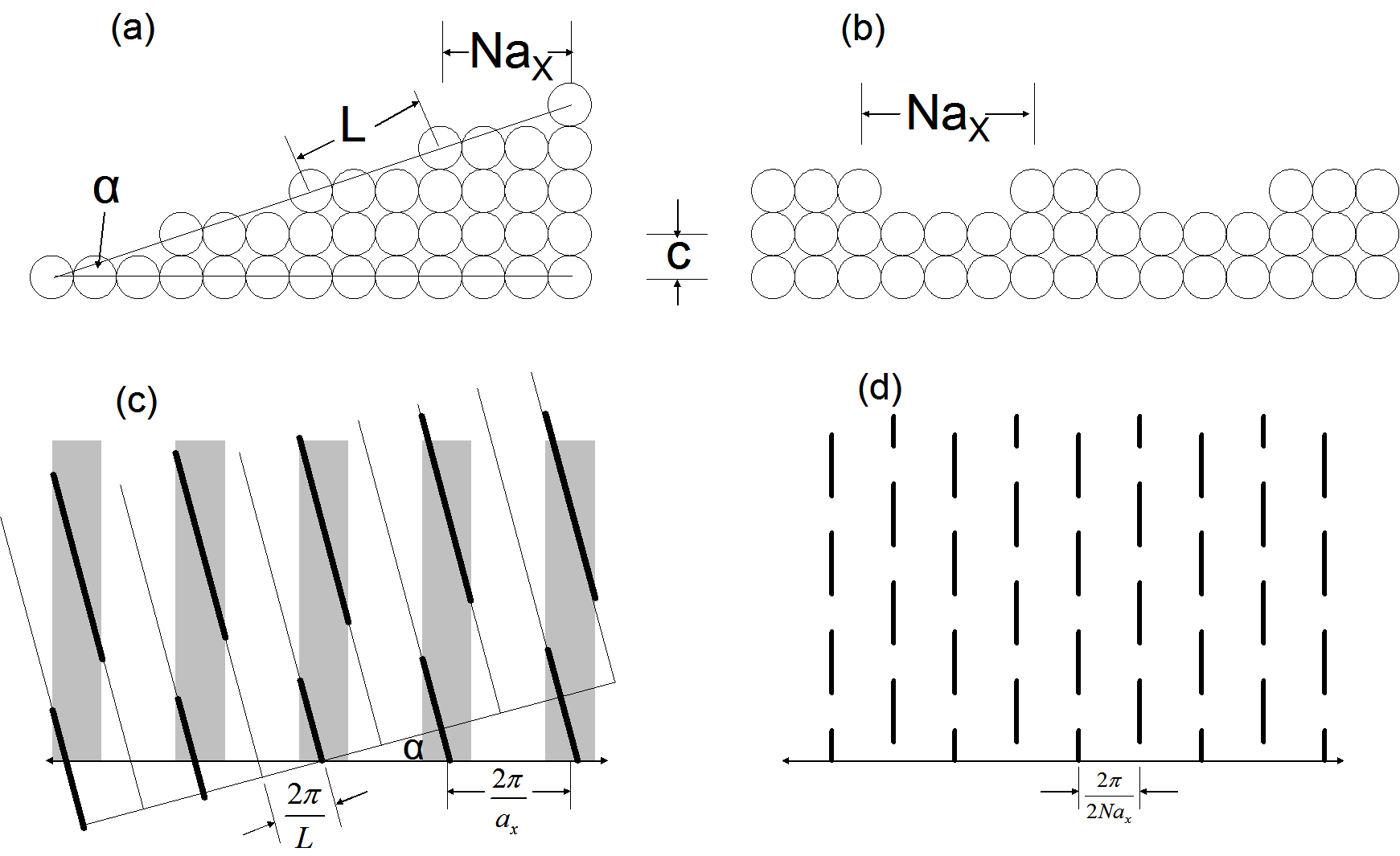
Fig. 3: Examples of (a) miscut cubic lattice and (b) ordered surface roughness, and (c,d) the corresponding CTR profiles, respectively.

Surface features in a material produce variations in the CTR intensity, which can be measured and used to evaluate what surface structures may be present. Two examples of this are shown in Fig. 3. In the case of a miscut at an angle $\alpha$, a second set of rods is produced in reciprocal space called superlattice rods, tilted from the regular lattice rods by the same angle, $\alpha$. The X-ray intensity is strongest in the region of intersection between the lattice rods (grey bars) and superlattice rods (black lines). In the case of ordered alternating steps, the CTR intensity is chopped into segments, as shown. In real materials, the occurrence of surface features will rarely be so regular, but these two examples show the way in which surface miscuts and roughness are manifested in the obtained diffraction patterns.
