= Physisorption =

Process involving electronic structure

Physisorption, also called physical adsorption, is a process in which the electronic structure of the atom or molecule is barely perturbed upon adsorption.

== Overview ==
The fundamental interacting force of physisorption is Van der Waals force. Even though the interaction energy is very weak (~10–100 meV), physisorption plays an important role in nature. For instance, the van der Waals attraction between surfaces and foot-hairs of geckos (see Synthetic setae) provides the remarkable ability to climb up vertical walls. Van der Waals forces originate from the interactions between induced, permanent or transient electric dipoles.

In comparison with chemisorption, in which the electronic structure of bonding atoms or molecules is changed and covalent or ionic bonds form, physisorption does not result in changes to the chemical bonding structure. In practice, the categorisation of a particular adsorption as physisorption or chemisorption depends principally on the binding energy of the adsorbate to the substrate, with physisorption being far weaker on a per-atom basis than any type of connection involving a chemical bond.

== Modeling by image charge ==
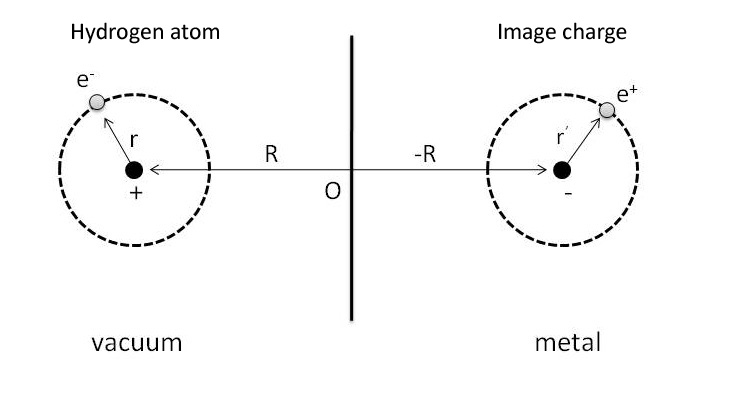
Fig. 1. Schematic illustration of an adsorbed hydrogen atom near a perfect conductor interacting with its image charges.

To give a simple illustration of physisorption, we can first consider an adsorbed hydrogen atom in front of a perfect conductor, as shown in Fig. 1. A nucleus with positive charge is located at R = (0, 0, Z), and the position coordinate of its electron, r = (x, y, z) is given with respect to the nucleus. The adsorption process can be viewed as the interaction between this hydrogen atom and its image charges of both the nucleus and electron in the conductor. As a result, the total electrostatic energy is the sum of attraction and repulsion terms:

$$V = {e^2\over 4\pi\varepsilon_0}\left(\frac{-1}{|2\mathbf R|}+\frac{-1}{|2\mathbf R+\mathbf r-\mathbf r'|}+\frac{1}{|2\mathbf R-\mathbf r'|}+\frac{1}{|2\mathbf R+\mathbf r|}\right).$$

The first term is the attractive interaction of the nucleus and its image charge, and the second term is due to the interaction of the electron and its image charge. The repulsive interaction is shown in the third and fourth terms arising from the interaction between the nucleus and the image electron, and, the interaction between the electron and the image nucleus, respectively.

By Taylor expansion in powers of |r| / |R|, this interaction energy can be further expressed as:

$$V = {-e^2\over 16\pi\varepsilon_0 Z^3}\left(\frac{x^2+y^2}{2}+z^2\right)+ {3e^2\over 32\pi\varepsilon_0 Z^4}\left(\frac{x^2+y^2}{2}{z}+z^3\right)+O\left(\frac{1}{Z^5}\right).$$

One can find from the first non-vanishing term that the physisorption potential depends on the distance Z between adsorbed atom and surface as Z^{−3}, in contrast with the r^{−6} dependence of the molecular van der Waals potential, where r is the distance between two dipoles.

== Modeling by quantum-mechanical oscillator ==
The van der Waals binding energy can be analyzed by another simple physical picture: modeling the motion of an electron around its nucleus by a three-dimensional simple harmonic oscillator with a potential energy V_{a}:

$$V_a = \frac{m_e}{2}{\omega^2}(x^2+y^2+z^2),$$

where m_{e} and ω are the mass and vibrational frequency of the electron, respectively.

As this atom approaches the surface of a metal and forms adsorption, this potential energy V_{a} will be modified due to the image charges by additional potential terms which are quadratic in the displacements:

$V_a = \frac{m_e}{2}{\omega^2}(x^2+y^2+z^2)-{e^2\over 16\pi\varepsilon_0 Z^3}\left(\frac{x^2+y^2}{2}+z^2\right)+\ldots$ (from the Taylor expansion above.)

Assuming

$$m_e \omega^2\gg{e^2\over 16\pi\varepsilon_0 Z^3},$$

the potential is well approximated as

$$V_a \sim \frac{m_e}{2}{\omega_1^2}(x^2+y^2)+\frac{m_e}{2}{\omega_2^2}z^2$$,

where

$$\begin{align}
\omega_1 &= \omega - {e^2\over 32\pi\varepsilon_0 m_e\omega Z^3},\\
\omega_2 &= \omega - {e^2\over 16\pi\varepsilon_0 m_e\omega Z^3}.
\end{align}$$

If one assumes that the electron is in the ground state, then the van der Waals binding energy is essentially the change of the zero-point energy:

$$V_v = \frac{\hbar}{2}(2\omega_1+\omega_2-3\omega)= - {\hbar e^2\over 16\pi\varepsilon_0 m_e\omega Z^3}.$$

This expression also shows the nature of the Z^{−3} dependence of the van der Waals interaction.

Furthermore, by introducing the atomic polarizability,

$$\alpha= \frac {e^2} {m_e\omega^2},$$

the van der Waals potential can be further simplified:

$$V_v = - {\hbar \alpha \omega\over 16\pi\varepsilon_0 Z^3}= -\frac{C_v}{Z^3},$$

where

$$C_v = {\hbar \alpha \omega\over 16\pi\varepsilon_0},$$

is the van der Waals constant which is related to the atomic polarizability.

Also, by expressing the fourth-order correction in the Taylor expansion above as (aC_{v}Z_{0}) / (Z^{4}), where a is some constant, we can define Z_{0} as the position of the dynamical image plane and obtain

Table 1. The van der Waals constant C_{v} and the position of the dynamical image plane Z_{0} for various rare gases atoms adsorbed on noble metal surfaces obtained by the jellium model. Note that C_{v} is in eV/Å^{3} and Z_{0} in Å.
	He		Ne		Ar		Kr		Xe	
	C_{v}	Z_{0}	C_{v}	Z_{0}	C_{v}	Z_{0}	C_{v}	Z_{0}	C_{v}	Z_{0}
Cu	0.225	0.22	0.452	0.21	1.501	0.26	2.11	0.27	3.085	0.29
Ag	0.249	0.2	0.502	0.19	1.623	0.24	2.263	0.25	3.277	0.27
Au	0.274	0.16	0.554	0.15	1.768	0.19	2.455	0.2	3.533	0.22

$$V_v = - \frac{C_v}{(Z-Z_0)^3}+O\left(\frac{1}{Z^5}\right).$$

The origin of Z_{0} comes from the spilling of the electron wavefunction out of the surface. As a result, the position of the image plane representing the reference for the space coordinate is different from the substrate surface itself and modified by Z_{0}.

Table 1 shows the jellium model calculation for van der Waals constant C_{v} and dynamical image plane Z_{0} of rare gas atoms on various metal surfaces. The increasing of C_{v} from He to Xe for all metal substrates is caused by the larger atomic polarizability of the heavier rare gas atoms. For the position of the dynamical image plane, it decreases with increasing dielectric function and is typically on the order of 0.2 Å.

== Physisorption potential ==
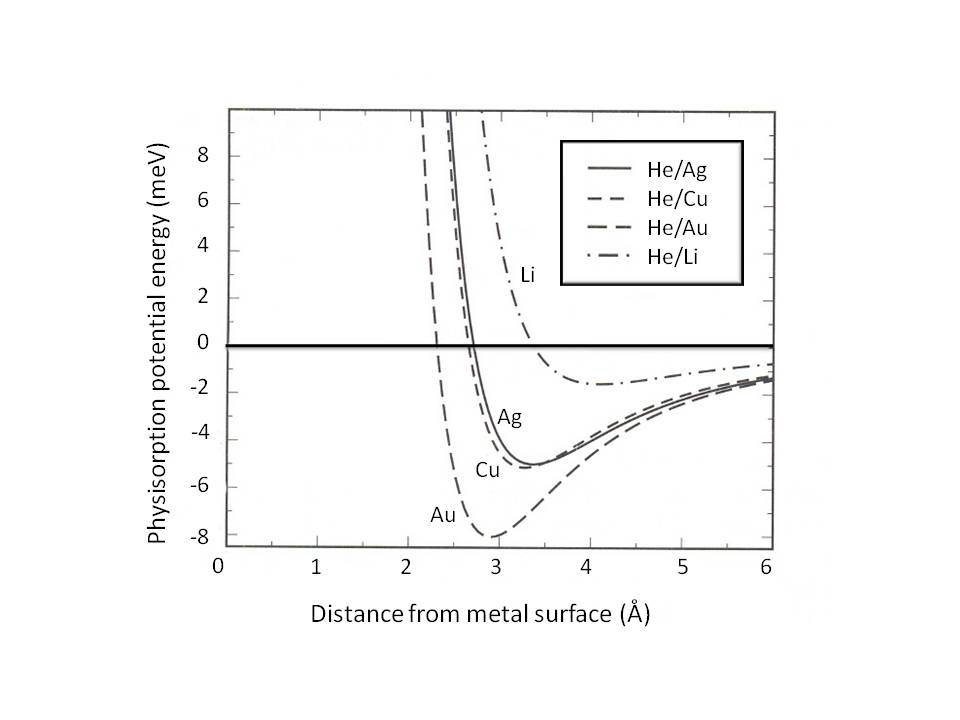
Fig. 2. Calculated physisorption potential energy for He adsorbed on various jellium metal surfaces. Note that the weak van der Waals attraction forms shallow wells with the energy about few meV.

Even though the van der Waals interaction is attractive, as the adsorbed atom moves closer to the surface the wavefunction of electron starts to overlap with that of the surface atoms. Further the energy of the system will increase due to the orthogonality of wavefunctions of the approaching atom and surface atoms.

This Pauli exclusion and repulsion are particularly strong for atoms with closed valence shells that dominate the surface interaction. As a result, the minimum energy of physisorption must be found by the balance between the long-range van der Waals attraction and short-range Pauli repulsion. For instance, by separating the total interaction of physisorption into two contributions—a short-range term depicted by Hartree–Fock theory and a long-range van der Waals attraction—the equilibrium position of physisorption for rare gases adsorbed on jellium substrate can be determined. Fig. 2 shows the physisorption potential energy of He adsorbed on Ag, Cu, and Au substrates which are described by the jellium model with different densities of smear-out background positive charges. It can be found that the weak van der Waals interaction leads to shallow attractive energy wells (<10 meV). One of the experimental methods for exploring physisorption potential energy is the scattering process, for instance, inert gas atoms scattered from metal surfaces. Certain specific features of the interaction potential between scattered atoms and surface can be extracted by analyzing the experimentally determined angular distribution and cross sections of the scattered particles.

== Quantum mechanical – thermodynamic modelling for surface area and porosity ==
Since 1980 two theories were worked on to explain adsorption and obtain equations that work. These two are referred to as the chi hypothesis, the quantum mechanical derivation, and excess surface work, ESW. Both these theories yield the same equation for flat surfaces:

$\theta=(\chi-\chi_\text{c})U(\chi-\chi_\text{c})$

Where U is the unit step function. The definitions of the other symbols is as follows:

$\theta:=n_\text{ads}/n_\text{m} \quad,\quad \chi := -\ln\bigl(-\ln\bigl(P/P_{\text{vap}}\bigr)\bigr)$

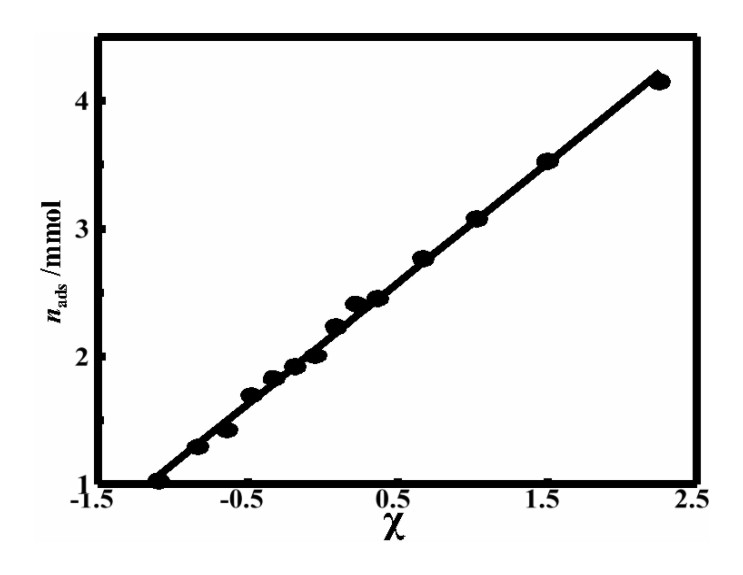
Fig. 3. $\chi$-plot of the data by D. A. Payne, K. S. W. Sing, D. H. Turk, (J. Colloid Interface Sci. 43 (1973) 287.), which was used to create the $\alpha$-s plot. $\chi$-plot is an excellent fit for the entire isotherm.

where "ads" stands for "adsorbed", "m" stands for "monolayer equivalence" and "vap" is reference to the vapor pressure ("ads" and "vap" are the latest IUPAC convention but "m" has no IUAPC equivalent notation) of the liquid adsorptive at the same temperature as the solid sample. The unit function creates the definition of the molar energy of adsorption for the first adsorbed molecule by:

$\chi_\text{c} =:-\ln\bigl(-E_\text{a}/RT\bigr)$

The plot of $n_{ads}$ adsorbed versus $\chi$ is referred to as the chi plot. For flat surfaces, the slope of the chi plot yields the surface area. Empirically, this plot was notice as being a very good fit to the isotherm by Polanyi and also by deBoer and Zwikker but not pursued. This was due to criticism in the former case by Einstein and in the latter case by Brunauer. This flat surface equation may be used as a "standard curve" in the normal tradition of comparison curves, with the exception that the porous sample's early portion of the plot of $n_{ads}$ versus $\chi$ acts as a self-standard. Ultramicroporous, microporous and mesoporous conditions may be analyzed using this technique. Typical standard deviations for full isotherm fits including porous samples are typically less than 2%.

A typical fit to good data on a homogeneous non-porous surface is shown in figure 3. The data is by Payne, Sing and Turk and was used to create the $\alpha$-s standard curve. Unlike the BET, which can only be at best fit over the range of 0.05 to 0.35 of P/Pvap, the range of the fit is the full isotherm.

== Comparison with chemisorption ==
- Physisorption is a general phenomenon and occurs in any solid/fluid or solid/gas system. Chemisorption is characterized by chemical specificity.
- In physisorption, perturbation of the electronic states of adsorbent and adsorbate is minimal. The adsorption forces include London Forces, dipole-dipole attractions, dipole-induced attraction and "hydrogen bonding." For chemisorption, changes in the electronic states may be detectable by suitable physical means, in other words, chemical bonding.
- Typical binding energy of physisorption is about 10–300 meV and non-localized. Chemisorption usually forms bonding with energy of 1–10 eV and localized.
- The elementary step in physisorption from a gas phase does not involve activation energy. Chemisorption often involves an activation energy.
- For physisorption gas phase molecules, adsorbates, form multilayer adsorption unless physical barriers, such as porosity, interfere. In chemisorption, molecules are adsorbed on the surface by valence bonds and only form monolayer adsorption.
- A direct transition from physisorption to chemisorption has been observed by attaching a CO molecule to the tip of an atomic force microscope and measuring its interaction with a single iron atom. This effect was observed in the late 1960s for benzene from field emission as reported by Condon and ESR measurements as reported by Moyes and Wells.
- Another way of looking at this is that chemisorption alters the topology of the electrons in the adsorbate molecule (by the process of chemical reaction) but physisorption does not.

== See also ==
- Adsorption
- Chemisorption
- van der Waals force
