= Schattschneider =

Schattschneider is a surname, and may refer to:

- Arnold Schattschneider (1869–1930), German musician and pedagogue
- Clemens Schattschneider (b. 1992), Austrian Snowboard World Cup competitor
- Dirk Schattschneider, North Rhine-Westphalian state representative to Europa-Union Deutschland
- Doris Schattschneider (b. 1939), American mathematician
- Elmer Eric Schattschneider (1892–1971), American political scientist
- Erika Schattschneider-Kollnig, German astronomer, namesake of asteroid 1402 Eri
- Julio Guilherme Schattschneider, Brazilian federal judge — see Desembargador
- Peter Schattschneider (b. 1950), Austrian physicist and writer
