= IERS B1946+708 =

Radio galaxy in the constellation Draco

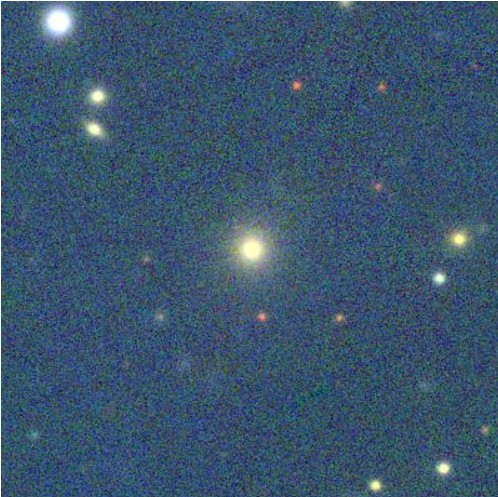
- The radio galaxy IERS B1946+708.

Observation data (J2000.0 epoch)
- Constellation: Draco
- Right ascension: 19^{h} 45^{m} 53.520^{s}
- Declination: +70° 55′ 48.727″
- Redshift: 0.100830
- Heliocentric radial velocity: 30,228 km/s
- Distance: 1.256 Gly
- Apparent magnitude (V): 16.70
- Apparent magnitude (B): 18.72

Characteristics
- Type: E Blazar
- Size: ~249,400 ly (76.48 kpc) (estimated)

Other designations
- S5 1946+70, WN B1946+7048, LEDA 2739486, 87GB 194612.4+704824, NVSS J194553+705548, 1946+708

IERS B1946+708 is a radio galaxy located in the constellation of Draco. It has a redshift of (z) 0.101, identified by emission lines in its optical spectrum, estimating it to be 1.25 billion light-years away. and was first discovered as an extragalactic radio source by astronomers in 1983. This object is classified as a compact symmetric object (CSO) in literature, but also has a gigahertz peaked spectrum.

== Description ==
IERS B1946+708 is described as an elliptical galaxy. It is known to have a disk described as inclined with a measurement of 600 parsecs in radius based on three-band imaging by Hubble Space Telescope. The nuclear regions of the galaxy are depicted to be much redder compared to its outer regions with B and R band magnitudes of 2-3. A companion galaxy can be seen 67 kiloparsecs away from it.

The source of IERS B1946+708 is known to be compact. It is described as having an S-symmetry with its radio core located halfway in the middle of two hotspots located in north and south directions. The hotspots are estimated to have an expansion velocity of 0.024c which corresponds to the age of 4000 ± 1000 years while the core has an inverted spectrum. Two narrow jets are found emerging from the core, subsequently bending and ending in the hotspot regions. These jets are known to contain four components which are found to move at speeds of between 0.6 and 0.9c with the fastest component having a velocity of 1.09 h^{−1} c.

Low polarization have also been observed in the jet components of IERS B1946+708 indicating Faraday depolarization by ionized gas and a tangled magnetic field. Neural hydrogen have also been detected in all of the components, with narrow lines evidently present towards the north hotspot likely caused by H I clouds associating with a warm region of gas.

X-ray observations by BeppoSAX found IERS B1946+708 has a strong presence of iron K-alpha emission lines in its spectrum. H I observations conducted by A.B. Peck and G.B. Taylor, found the source has multi-peaked absorption throughout its radio continuum with the maximum column density located towards the core, displaying velocity dispersion of 350 kilometers per seconds. This suggests IERS B1946+708 has a circumnuclear disk.
