= Electron magnetic circular dichroism =

Electron magnetic circular dichroism (EMCD) (also known as electron energy-loss magnetic chiral dichroism) is the EELS equivalent of XMCD.

The effect was first proposed in 2003 and experimentally confirmed in 2006 by the group of Prof. Peter Schattschneider at the Vienna University of Technology.

Similarly to XMCD, EMCD is a difference spectrum of two EELS spectra taken in a magnetic field with opposite helicities. Under appropriate scattering conditions virtual photons with specific circular polarizations can be absorbed, giving rise to spectral differences. The largest difference is expected between the case where one virtual photon with left circular polarization and one with right circular polarization are absorbed. By closely analyzing the difference in the EMCD spectrum, information can be obtained on the magnetic properties of the atom, such as its spin and orbital magnetic moment.

In the case of transition metals such as iron, cobalt, and nickel, the absorption spectra for EMCD are usually measured at the L-edge. This corresponds to the excitation of a 2p electron to a 3d state by the absorption of a virtual photon providing the ionisation energy. The absorption is visible as a spectral feature in the electron energy loss spectrum (EELS). Because the 3d electron states are the origin of the magnetic properties of the elements, the spectra contain information on the magnetic properties. Moreover, since the energy of each transition depends on the atomic number, the information obtained is element specific, that is, it is possible to distinguish the magnetic properties of a given element by examining the EMCD spectrum at its characteristic energy (708 eV for iron).

Since in both EMCD and XMCD the same electronic transitions are probed, the information obtained is the same. However EMCD has a higher spatial resolution and depth sensitivity than its X-ray counterpart. Moreover, EMCD can be measured on any TEM equipped with an EELS detector, whereas XMCD is normally measured only on dedicated synchrotron beamlines.

A disadvantage of EMCD in its original incarnation is its requirement of crystalline materials with a thickness and orientation that just precisely gives the correct 90 degree phase shift needed for EMCD. However, a new method has recently demonstrated that electron vortex beams can also be used to measure EMCD without the geometrical constraints of the original procedure.

== See also ==
- Magnetic circular dichroism
- Faraday effect
- XMCD
