= SEM-XRF =

X-ray sources for SEM

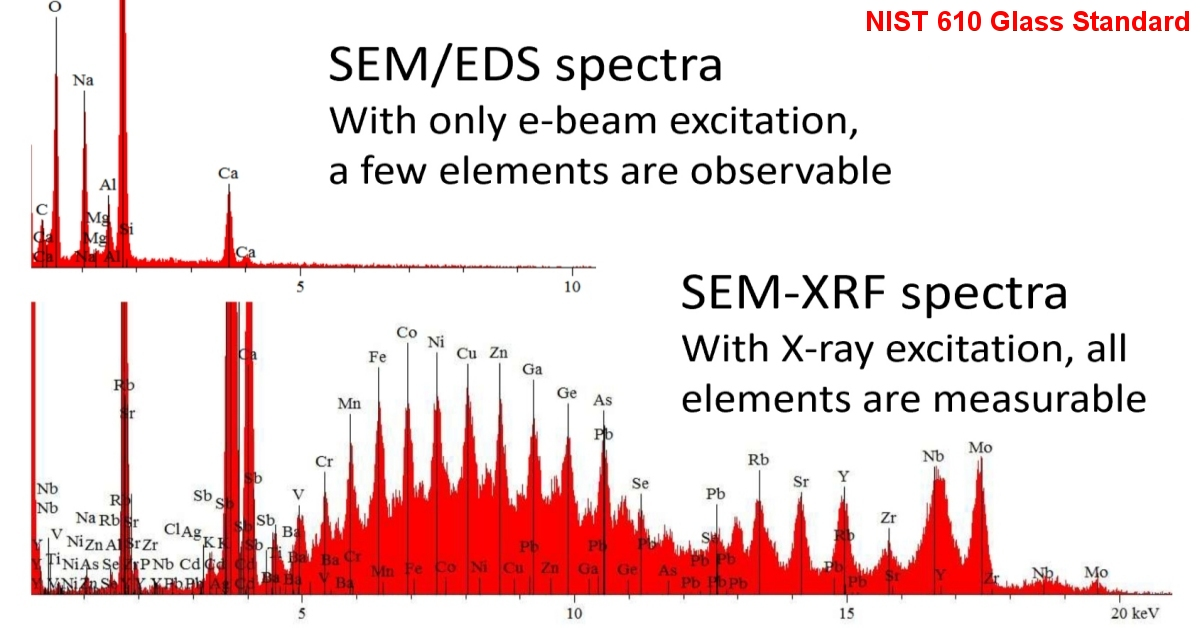
SEM/EDS spectra is compared to SEM-XRF spectra for a NIST 610 standard.

SEM-XRF is an established technical term for adding a (typically micro-focus) X-ray generator (X-ray source) to a Scanning Electron Microscope (SEM). Technological progress in the fields of small-spot low-power X-ray tubes and of polycapillary X-ray optics has enabled the development of compact micro-focus X-ray sources that can be attached to a SEM equipped for energy-dispersive X-ray spectroscopy (EDS, EDX, EDXS or XEDS).

As shown in the adjacent image, when micro-focus X-ray fluorescence (microXRF) is performed with a SEM, elemental analysis analytical figures of merit are extended to the point where trace level quantification and bulk analysis are possible. By combining the analytical information obtained from the X-ray spectra excited with electrons and with photons respectively, the main elements as well as trace elements, of low and high atomic number, can be analyzed – albeit with different spatial resolutions.

In 1986, Sandia and Lawrence Livermore National Labs coauthored a paper (with Kevex Corporation) regarding parameters affecting X-ray micro-fluorescence. As a followup in 1988, Cross & Wherry described an X-ray micro-fluorescence analyzer which combines the nondestructive analytical method of X-ray fluorescence with relatively small spatial discrimination (less than 50 μm) such that composition (chemistry), thickness and micro-structural measurements can be made on a wide variety of heterogeneous materials in a few seconds. It was shown that, by scanning samples with an X-Y stage, quantitative or qualitative micro-structural information could be gathered. Both these papers provided a preview into the coming integration of Micro-X-ray fluorescence with SEM.

By 1991, Pozsgai published a review article detailing the possibilities of carrying out x-ray micro-fluorescence analysis within the SEM context. The main approaches involved converting the electron optical column of an electron microscope into a transmission x-ray tube, using micro-focusing x-ray tubes, combining x-ray tubes with capillary techniques, as well as combining x-ray tubes with monochromators and applying synchrotron radiation.

SEM-XRF was first commercialized by IXRF Systems (Austin, TX) in March 2005. Bruker Corporation (Billerica, MA) followed in August 2013.

== Commercial links ==
Two commercial vendors offer this technology:

- Xb Micro-XRF
- QUANTAX Micro-XRF
