= Characteristic X-ray =

X-rays characteristic of specific elements

Characteristic X-rays are emitted when outer-shell electrons fill a vacancy in the inner shell of an atom, releasing X-rays in a pattern that is "characteristic" to each element. Characteristic X-rays were discovered by Charles Glover Barkla in 1909, who later won the Nobel Prize in Physics for his discovery in 1917.

== Explanation ==
Characteristic X-rays are produced when an element is bombarded with high-energy particles, which can be photons, electrons or ions (such as protons). When the incident particle strikes a bound electron (the target electron) in an atom, the target electron is ejected from the inner shell of the atom. After the electron has been ejected, the atom is left with a vacant energy level, also known as a core hole. Outer-shell electrons then fall into the inner shell, emitting quantized photons with an energy level equivalent to the energy difference between the higher and lower states. Each element has a unique set of energy levels, and thus the transition from higher to lower energy levels produces X-rays with frequencies that are characteristic to each element.

Sometimes, however, instead of releasing the energy in the form of an X-ray, the energy can be transferred to another electron, which is then ejected from the atom. This is called the Auger effect, which is used in Auger electron spectroscopy to analyze the elemental composition of surfaces.

== Notation ==
The different electron states which exist in an atom are usually described by atomic orbital notation, as is used in chemistry and general physics. However, X-ray science has special terminology to describe the transition of electrons from upper to lower energy levels: traditional Siegbahn notation, or alternatively, simplified X-ray notation.

In Siegbahn notation, when an electron falls from the L shell to the K shell, the X-ray radiation emitted is called a K-alpha (Kα) emission. Similarly, when an electron falls from the M shell to the K shell, the X-ray radiation emitted is called a K-beta (Kβ) emission.

== Prominent transitions ==
=== K-alpha ===
Siegbahn notation of electron transitions between shells.

K-alpha emission lines result when an electron transitions to a vacancy in the innermost "K" shell (principal quantum number n = 1) from a p orbital of the second, "L" shell (n = 2), leaving a vacancy there.

By posing that initially in the K shell there is a single vacancy (and, hence, a single electron is already there), as well as that the L shell is not entirely empty in the final state of the transition, this definition limits the minimal number of electrons in the atom to three, i.e., to lithium (or a lithium-like ion). In the case of two- or one-electron atoms, one talks instead about He-alpha and Lyman-alpha, respectively. In a more formal definition, the L shell is initially fully occupied. In this case, the lighter species with K-alpha is neon. This choice also places K-alpha firmly in the X-ray energy range.

Similarly to Lyman-alpha, the K-alpha emission is composed of two spectral lines, K-alpha_{1} (Kα_{1}) and K-alpha_{2} (Kα_{2}). The K-alpha_{1} emission is slightly higher in energy (and, thus, has a lower wavelength) than the K-alpha_{2} emission. For all elements, the ratio of the intensities of K-alpha_{1} and K-alpha_{2} is very close to 2:1.

The K-alpha line in copper is frequently used as the primary source of X-ray radiation in lab-based X-ray diffraction (XRD) instruments.

=== K-beta ===
K-beta emissions, similar to K-alpha emissions, result when an electron transitions to the innermost "K" shell (principal quantum number 1) from a 3p orbital of the third or "M" shell (with principal quantum number 3).

== Transition energies ==
The transition energies can be approximately calculated by the use of Moseley's law. For example, $E_{K\alpha} = \frac{3}{4}(Z-1)^2 Ry \approx 10.2(Z - 1)^2~\mathrm{eV}$, where Z is the atomic number and Ry is the Rydberg energy. The energy of the iron (Z = 26) K-alpha, calculated in this fashion, is 6.375 keV, accurate within 1%. However, for higher Z's (like Copper, often used in X-ray diffraction experiments) the error grows quickly.

Accurate values of transition energies of Kα, Kβ, Lα, Lβ, and so on for different elements can be found in the atomic databases.

== Applications ==
Characteristic X-rays can be used to identify the particular element from which they are emitted. This property is used in various techniques, including X-ray fluorescence spectroscopy, particle-induced X-ray emission, energy-dispersive X-ray spectroscopy, and wavelength-dispersive X-ray spectroscopy.

== See also ==
- Spectral line
- Electron capture
- Internal conversion
