= Pierre Victor Auger =

French physicist

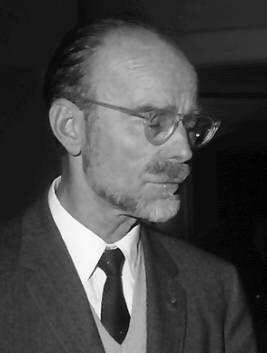
- Pierre Auger (1959)
- Born: 14 May 1899; Paris, France
- Died: 24 December 1993 (aged 94); Paris, France
- Education: University of Paris
- Known for: Air shower Cosmic rays Auger effect Auger electron spectroscopy Auger recombination
- Awards: Kalinga Prize (1971); Three Physicists Prize (1967)
- Scientific career
- Fields: Physics
- Workplaces: Académie des sciences (France)

Pierre Victor Auger (French pronunciation: [oˈʒe]; 14 May 1899 – 24 December 1993) was a French physicist, born in Paris. He worked in the fields of atomic physics, nuclear physics, and cosmic ray physics. He is famous for being one of the discoverers of the Auger effect, named after him.

== Early life ==
Pierre's father was chemistry professor Victor Auger. Pierre Auger was a student at the École normale supérieure in Paris from 1919 to 1922, the year when he passed the agrégation of physics. He then joined the physical chemistry laboratory of the faculté des sciences of the University of Paris under the direction of Jean Perrin to work there on the photoelectric effect.

== Career ==
In 1926, he obtained his doctorate in physics from the University of Paris. In 1927, he was named assistant to the faculté des sciences of Paris and, at the same time, adjoint chief of service to l'Institut de biologie physico-chimique. Chief of work to faculty in 1934 and general secretary of the annual tables of the constants in 1936, he was named university lecturer in physics to the faculty on the first of November 1937. He was charged with, until 1940, the course on the experimental bases of the quantum theory within the chair of theoretical physics and astrophysics. He was also adjoint director of the laboratory of physical chemistry. He then occupied the chair of quantum physics and relativity of the faculté des sciences of Paris.

At the end of World War II, he was named director of higher education from 1945 to 1948, which permitted him to introduce the first chair of genetics at the Sorbonne, conferred upon Boris Ephrussi.

The process where Auger electrons are emitted from atoms is used in Auger electron spectroscopy to study the elements on the surface of materials. This method was named after him, independently from Lise Meitner who discovered the process one year before in 1922, albeit in a different, and then controversial, context about the nature of the beta-rays versus Charles Drummond Ellis.

== Findings ==
In his work with cosmic rays, he found that the cosmic radiation events were coincident in time meaning that they were associated with a single event, an air shower. He estimated that the energy of the incoming particle that creates large air showers must be at least 10^{15} electronvolts (eV) = 10^{6} particles of 10^{8} eV (critical energy in air) and a factor of ten for energy loss from traversing the atmosphere.

== Honors and achievements ==
- He was European Space Research Organisation (ESRO) first Director General and one of the forefathers for the CERN foundation.
- He was president of the Centre international de calcul (Rome). From 1948 to 1959, he directed at UNESCO the department of mathematical and natural sciences.
- He was elected a member of the Académie des sciences in 1977.
- He hosted a broadcast of popularization of exacting science on Friday evenings on the public radio station France Culture from September 1969 to June 1986, entitled Les Grandes Avenues de la science moderne.
- The world's largest cosmic ray detector, the Pierre Auger Observatory, is named after him.

== See also ==
- Auger therapy
