= Orbital angular momentum of free electrons =

Quantised attribute of electrons in free space

Phase (color) and amplitude (brightness) of electron wavefunctions with several values of the orbital angular momentum quantum number $m$ and a Laguerre-Gauss amplitude profile. $\ell = +1$ (top left), $\ell = -1$ (top right), $\ell = 0$ (lower left) are all eigenstates of the orbital angular momentum operator, while the superposition of $\ell = +1$ and $\ell = -1$ (lower right) is not. Both of the upper wavefunctions have $\langle L_z \rangle \neq 0$, while the lower wavefunctions have $\langle L_z \rangle = 0$.

Electrons in free space can carry quantized orbital angular momentum (OAM) projected along the direction of propagation. This orbital angular momentum corresponds to helical wavefronts, or, equivalently, a phase proportional to the azimuthal angle. Electron beams with quantized orbital angular momentum are also called electron vortex beams.

== Theory ==
An electron in free space travelling at non-relativistic speeds, follows the Schrödinger equation for a free particle, that is
$$i\hbar\frac{\partial}{\partial t} \Psi(\mathbf{r},t) = \frac{-\hbar^2}{2m}\nabla^2 \Psi(\mathbf{r},t),$$
where $\hbar$ is the reduced Planck constant, $\Psi(\mathbf r , t)$ is the single-electron wave function, $m$ its mass, $\mathbf r$ the position vector, and $t$ is time. This equation is a type of wave equation and when written in the Cartesian coordinate system ($x$,$y$,$z$), the solutions are given by a linear combination of plane waves, in the form of
$$\Psi_{\mathbf p}(\mathbf{r},t)\propto e^{i(\mathbf{p}\cdot\mathbf{r}-E(\mathbf{p})t)/\hbar}$$
where $\mathbf{p}$ is the linear momentum and $E(\mathbf{p})$ is the electron energy, given by the usual dispersion relation $E(\mathbf{p})=\frac{p^2}{2m}$. By measuring the momentum of the electron, its wave function must collapse and give a particular value. If the energy of the electron beam is selected beforehand, the total momentum (not its directional components) of the electrons is fixed to a certain degree of precision. When the Schrödinger equation is written in the cylindrical coordinate system ($\rho$,$\theta$,$z$), the solutions are no longer plane waves, but instead are given by Bessel beams, solutions that are a linear combination of
$$\Psi_{p_\rho,\,p_z,\,\ell}(\rho,\theta,z)\propto J_{|\ell|}\left(\frac{p_\rho \rho}{\hbar} \right)e^{i(p_zz-Et)/\hbar}e^{i\ell\theta},$$
that is, the product of three types of functions: a plane wave with momentum $p_z$ in the $z$-direction, a radial component written as a Bessel function of the first kind $J_{|\ell|}$, where $p_\rho$ is the linear momentum in the radial direction, and finally an azimuthal component written as $e^{i\ell\theta}$ where $\ell$ (sometimes written $m_z$) is the magnetic quantum number related to the angular momentum $L_z$ in the $z$-direction. Thus, the dispersion relation reads $E=(p_z^2+p_\rho^2)/2m$. By azimuthal symmetry, the wave function has the property that $\ell=0,\pm 1,\pm2,\cdots$ is necessarily an integer, thus $L_z = \hbar\ell$ is quantized. If a measurement of $L_z$ is performed on an electron with selected energy, as $E$ does not depend on $\ell$, it can give any integer value. It is possible to experimentally prepare states with non-zero $\ell$ by adding an azimuthal phase to an initial state with $\ell = 0$; experimental techniques designed to measure the orbital angular momentum of a single electron are under development. Simultaneous measurement of electron energy and orbital angular momentum is allowed because the Hamiltonian commutes with the angular momentum operator related to $L_z$.

Note that the equations above follow for any free quantum particle with mass, not necessarily electrons. The quantization of $L_z$ can also be shown in the spherical coordinate system, where the wave function reduces to a product of spherical Bessel functions and spherical harmonics.

== Preparation ==
There are a variety of methods to prepare an electron in an orbital angular momentum state. All methods involve an interaction with an optical element such that the electron acquires an azimuthal phase. The optical element can be material, magnetostatic, or electrostatic. It is possible to either directly imprint an azimuthal phase, or to imprint an azimuthal phase with a holographic diffraction grating, where grating pattern is defined by the interference of the azimuthal phase and a planar or spherical carrier wave.

== Applications ==
Electron vortex beams have a variety of proposed and demonstrated applications, including for mapping magnetization, studying chiral molecules and chiral plasmon resonances, and identification of crystal chirality.

== Measurement ==
Interferometric methods borrowed from light optics also work to determine the orbital angular momentum of free electrons in pure states. Interference with a planar reference wave, diffractive filtering and self-interference can serve to characterize a prepared electron orbital angular momentum state. In order to measure the orbital angular momentum of a superposition or of the mixed state that results from interaction with an atom or material, a non-interferometric method is necessary. Wavefront flattening, transformation of an orbital angular momentum state into a planar wave, or cylindrically symmetric Stern-Gerlach-like measurement is necessary to measure the orbital angular momentum mixed or superposition state.

== See also ==
- Matter wave
