= Perley Ason Ross =

Perley Ason Ross (6 April 1883 – 13 March 1939) was a U.S. experimental physicist who worked, carefully and without seeking publicity, at some essential problems in the behaviour of X-rays.

Born in Panacea, Missouri he was awarded his PhD from Stanford University in 1911, becoming a full professor there in 1927, after a year at Cornell University.

Some of his principal studies included:

- Scattering of X-rays by matter;
- Development of the Ross differential filter for X-ray spectroscopy;
- X-ray polarization;
- Compton scattering; and
- Radiative Auger effect.

His daughter, Betsy, married fellow Stanford physicist William Webster Hansen.
