= Radiative Auger effect =

In optics and spectroscopy, the radiative Auger effect is a decay channel of an inner-shell atomic vacancy state, in which an X-ray photon is emitted accompanying simultaneous promotion of an electron into either a bound or a continuum state. Thus the transition energy is shared between the photon and the electron. The effect was first observed by Felix Bloch and Perley Ason Ross, with the initial theoretical explanation by Bloch. Later the effect has also been observed on defects in the solid-state, semiconductor quantum emitters, as well as two-dimensional electron gases. In the latter case, the effect is typically referred to as shake-up. In semiconductor quantum dot, radiative Auger transitions can also be coherently driven by laser fields, enabling the preparation of superposition states of carrier orbital levels.

== See also ==
- Auger effect
- Radiative transition
