= X-ray magnetic circular dichroism =

Spectroscopic technique

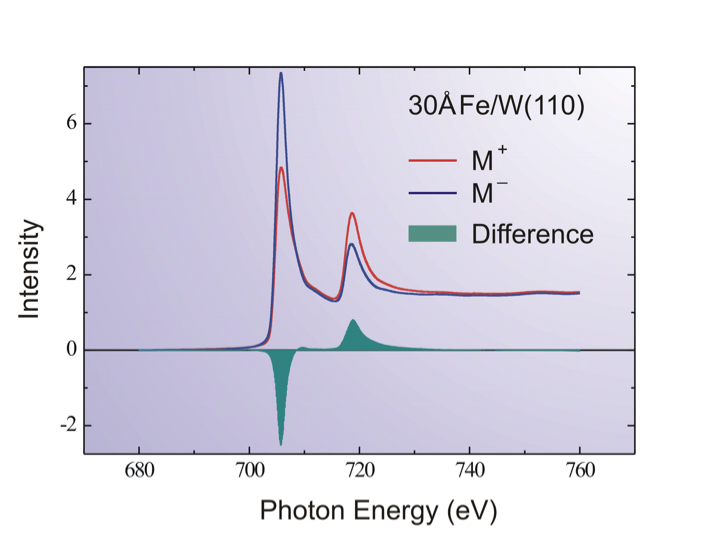
XMCD spectrum of iron

X-ray magnetic circular dichroism (XMCD) is a difference spectrum of two X-ray absorption spectra (XAS) taken in a magnetic field, one taken with left circularly polarized light, and one with right circularly polarized light. By closely analyzing the difference in the XMCD spectrum, information can be obtained on the magnetic properties of the atom, such as its spin and orbital magnetic moment. Using XMCD magnetic moments below 10^{−5} μ_{B} can be observed.

This simple diagram illustrates the general idea of X-ray magnetic circular dichroism. It shows the electronic transitions for 2p→3d (L-edge) absorption. It is not to scale.

In the case of transition metals such as iron, cobalt, and nickel, the absorption spectra for XMCD are usually measured at the L-edge. This corresponds to the process in the iron case: with iron, a 2p electron is excited to a 3d state by an X-ray of about 700 eV. Because the 3d electron states are the origin of the magnetic properties of the elements, the spectra contain information on the magnetic properties. In rare-earth elements usually, the M_{4,5}-edges are measured, corresponding to electron excitations from a 3d state to mostly 4f states.

== Line intensities and selection rules ==
The line intensities and selection rules of XMCD can be understood by considering the transition matrix elements of an atomic state $\vert{njm}\rangle$ excited by circularly polarised light. Here $n$ is the principal, $j$ the angular momentum and $m$ the magnetic quantum numbers. The polarisation vector of left and right circular polarised light can be rewritten in terms of spherical harmonics
$$\mathbf{e} = \frac{1}{\sqrt{2}}\left(x \pm iy\right) = \sqrt{\frac{4\pi}{3}} r Y^{\pm 1}_{1}\left(\theta,\varphi\right)$$
leading to an expression for the transition matrix element $\langle n^{\prime}j^{\prime}m^{\prime}\vert \mathbf{e}\cdot\mathbf{r}\vert njm\rangle$ which can be simplified using the 3-j symbol:
$$\langle n^{\prime}j^{\prime}m^{\prime}\vert \mathbf{e}\cdot\mathbf{r}\vert njm\rangle =
\sqrt{\frac{4\pi}{3}}\langle n^{\prime}j^{\prime}m^{\prime}\vert rY_{1}^{\pm 1}\left(\theta,\varphi\right)\vert njm\rangle\propto
\int_{0}^{\infty}dr~rR_{n^{\prime}j^{\prime}}(r)R_{nj}(r)\int_{\Omega}d\Omega~{Y_{j^{\prime}}^{m^{\prime}}}^{*}\left(\theta,\varphi\right) Y_{1}^{\pm 1}\left(\theta,\varphi\right) Y_{ j}^{m}\left(\theta,\varphi\right)$$
$= \sqrt{\frac{(2j^{\prime}+1) (2j+1)}{4 \pi}} \langle{j^{\prime}~0~j~0}\vert {1~0}\rangle \langle {j^{\prime} ~ m^{\prime}~j~m}\vert {1 ~ \pm 1}\rangle$

The radial part is referred to as the line strength while the angular one contains symmetries from which selection rules can be deduced. Rewriting the product of three spherical harmonics with the 3-j symbol finally leads to:
$$\sqrt{\frac{(2j^{\prime}+1)(2j+1)}{4 \pi}} \langle {j^{\prime}~0~j~0}\vert {1~0}\rangle \langle {j^{\prime} ~ m^{\prime}~j~m}\vert {1 ~ \pm 1}\rangle = \sqrt{\frac{(2j^{\prime} + 1)(2j + 1)(2 + 1)}{4\pi}}
\begin{pmatrix} {j^{\prime}} & j & 1 \\ 0 & 0 & 0 \end{pmatrix}
\begin{pmatrix} j^{\prime} & j & 1 \\ m^{\prime} & m & \mp 1\end{pmatrix}$$
The 3-j symbols are not zero only if $j, j^{\prime},m,m^{\prime}$ satisfy the following conditions giving us the following selection rules for dipole transitions with circular polarised light:

1. $\Delta J = \pm 1$
2. $\Delta m = 0, \pm 1$

== Derivation of sum rules for 3d and 4f systems ==
We will derive the XMCD sum rules from their original sources, as presented in works by Carra, Thole, Koenig, Sette, Altarelli, van der Laan, and Wang. The following equations can be used to derive the actual magnetic moments associated with the states:

$$\begin{align}
\mu_l &= -\langle L_z \rangle \cdot \mu_B \\
\mu_s &= -2 \cdot \langle S_z \rangle \cdot \mu_B
\end{align}$$

We employ the following approximation:

$$\begin{align}
\mu_{\text{XAS}}' &= \mu^{\text{+}}  + \mu^{\text{-}}  + \mu^{\text{0}} \\
&\approx \mu^{\text{+}}  + \mu^{\text{-}}  + \frac{\mu^{\text{+}}  + \mu^{\text{-}}}{2} \\
&= \frac{3}{2} \left( \mu^{\text{+}}  + \mu^{\text{-}} \right),
\end{align}$$

where $\mu^{\text{0}}$ represents linear polarization, $\mu^{\text{-}}$ right circular polarization, and $\mu^{\text{+}}$ left circular polarization. This distinction is crucial, as experiments at beamlines typically utilize either left and right circular polarization or switch the field direction while maintaining the same circular polarization, or a combination of both.

The sum rules, as presented in the aforementioned references, are:

$$\begin{align}
\langle S_z \rangle &= \frac{\int_{j_+}d\omega (\mu^+ - \mu^-)-[(c+1)/c]\int_{j_-}d\omega (\mu^+ - \mu^-)}{\int_{j_+ + j_-}d\omega {(\mu^+ + \mu^- + \mu^0)}} \cdot \frac{3c(4l+2-n)}{l(l+1)-2-c(c+1)} \\
&- \frac{3c(l(l+1)[l(l+1)+2c(c+1)+4]-3(c-1)^2(c+2)^2)}{(l(l+1)-2-c(c+1))\cdot 6lc(l+1)} \langle T_z \rangle,
\end{align}$$

Here, $\langle T_z \rangle$ denotes the magnetic dipole tensor, c and l represent the initial and final orbital respectively (s,p,d,f,... = 0,1,2,3,...). The edges integrated within the measured signal are described by $j_{\pm} = c \pm 1/2$, and n signifies the number of electrons in the final shell.

The magnetic orbital moment $\langle L_z \rangle$, using the same sign conventions, can be expressed as:

$$\begin{align}
\langle L_z \rangle &= \frac{\int_{j_+ + j_-}d\omega (\mu^+ - \mu^-)}{\int_{j_+ + j_-}d\omega {(\mu^+ + \mu^- + \mu^0)}} \cdot \frac{2l(l+1)(4l+2-n)}{l(l+1) + 2 - c(c+1)}
\end{align}$$

For moment calculations, we use c=1 and l=2 for L_{2,3}-edges, and c=2 and l=3 for M_{4,5}-edges. Applying the earlier approximation, we can express the L_{2,3}-edges as:

$$\begin{align}
\langle S_z \rangle &= (10-n)\frac{\int_{j_+}d\omega (\mu^+ - \mu^-)-2\int_{j_-}d\omega (\mu^+ - \mu^-)}{\frac{3}{2}\int_{j_+ + j_-}d\omega {(\mu^+ + \mu^-)}} \\
&\cdot \frac{3}{6-2-2} -  \frac{3(6[6+4+4]-0)}{(6-2-2)\cdot 36} \langle T_z \rangle \\
&= (10-n)\frac{\int_{j_+}d\omega (\mu^+ - \mu^-)-2\int_{j_-}d\omega (\mu^+ - \mu^-)}{\frac{3}{2}\int_{j_+ + j_-}d\omega {(\mu^+ + \mu^-)}} \\
&\cdot \frac{3}{2} -  \frac{3(6[14]-0)}{2\cdot 36} \langle T_z \rangle \\
&= (10-n) \frac{\int_{j_+}d\omega (\mu^+ - \mu^-)-2\int_{j_-}d\omega (\mu^+ - \mu^-)}{\int_{j_+ + j_-}d\omega {(\mu^+ + \mu^-)}}  -  \frac{7}{2} \langle T_z \rangle.
\end{align}$$

For 3d transitions, $\langle L_z \rangle$ is calculated as:

$$\begin{align}
\langle L_z \rangle &= (10-n) \frac{\int_{j_+ + j_-}d\omega (\mu^+ - \mu^-)}{\frac{3}{2}\int_{j_+ + j_-}d\omega {(\mu^+ + \mu^-)}} \cdot \frac{12}{6 + 2 - 2} \\
&= (10-n) \frac{4}{3} \frac{\int_{j_+ + j_-}d\omega (\mu^+ - \mu^-)}{\int_{j_+ + j_-}d\omega {(\mu^+ + \mu^-)}}
\end{align}$$

For 4f rare earth metals (M_{4,5}-edges), using c=2 and l=3:

$$\begin{align}
\langle S_z \rangle &= (14-n)\frac{\int_{j_+}d\omega (\mu^+ - \mu^-)-[3/2]\int_{j_-}d\omega (\mu^+ - \mu^-)}{\frac{3}{2}\int_{j_+ + j_-}d\omega {(\mu^+ + \mu^-)}} \cdot \frac{6}{3(4)-2-2(3)} \\
&- \frac{6(3(4)[3(4)+4(3)+4]-3(1)^2(4)^2)}{(3(4)-2-2(3))\cdot 36(4)} \langle T_z \rangle\\
&= (14-n)\frac{\int_{j_+}d\omega (\mu^+ - \mu^-)-[3/2]\int_{j_-}d\omega (\mu^+ - \mu^-)}{\frac{3}{2}\int_{j_+ + j_-}d\omega {(\mu^+ + \mu^-)}}\cdot \frac{6}{12-2-6} \\
&- \frac{6(12[12+12+4]-48)}{4\cdot 144} \langle T_z \rangle \\
&= (14-n)\frac{\int_{j_+}d\omega (\mu^+ - \mu^-)-[3/2]\int_{j_-}d\omega (\mu^+ - \mu^-)}{\frac{3}{2}\int_{j_+ + j_-}d\omega {(\mu^+ + \mu^-)}}\cdot \frac{3}{2} - \frac{1728}{576} \langle T_z \rangle \\
&= (14-n)\frac{\int_{j_+}d\omega (\mu^+ - \mu^-)-[3/2]\int_{j_-}d\omega (\mu^+ - \mu^-)}{\int_{j_+ + j_-}d\omega {(\mu^+ + \mu^-)}} - 3 \langle T_z \rangle
\end{align}$$

The calculation of $\langle L_z \rangle$ for 4f transitions is as follows:

$$\begin{align}
\langle L_z \rangle &= (14-n)\frac{\int_{j_+ + j_-}d\omega (\mu^+ - \mu^-)}{\frac{3}{2}\int_{j_+ + j_-}d\omega {(\mu^+ + \mu^-)}}\cdot \frac{6(4)}{3(4) + 2 - 2(3)} \\
&= (14-n)\frac{\int_{j_+ + j_-}d\omega (\mu^+ - \mu^-)}{\frac{3}{2}\int_{j_+ + j_-}d\omega {(\mu^+ + \mu^-)}}\cdot \frac{24}{8}\\
&= (14-n)\cdot 2\frac{\int_{j_+ + j_-}d\omega (\mu^+ - \mu^-)}{\int_{j_+ + j_-}d\omega {(\mu^+ + \mu^-)}}
\end{align}$$

When $\langle T_z \rangle$ is neglected, the term is commonly referred to as the effective spin $\langle S_z^{\text{eff}} \rangle$. By disregarding $\langle L_z \rangle$ and calculating the effective spin moment $\langle S_z^{\text{eff}} \rangle$, it becomes apparent that both the non-magnetic XAS component $\int_{j_+ + j_-}d\omega {(\mu^+ + \mu^-)}$ and the number of electrons in the shell n appear in both equations. This allows for the calculation of the orbital to effective spin moment ratio using only the XMCD spectra.

== See also ==
- EMCD
- Faraday effect
- Magnetic circular dichroism
- Magnetic field
- Transition metals
