= Siegbahn notation =

Notation in X-ray spectroscopy

The Siegbahn notation is used in X-ray spectroscopy to name the spectral lines that are characteristic to elements. It was introduced by Manne Siegbahn.

The characteristic lines in X-ray emission spectra correspond to atomic electronic transitions where an electron jumps down to a vacancy in one of the inner shells of an atom. Such a hole in an inner shell may have been produced by bombardment with electrons in an X-ray tube, by other particles as in PIXE, by other X-rays in X-ray fluorescence or by radioactive decay of the atom's nucleus.

Although still widely used in spectroscopy, this notation is unsystematic and often confusing. For these reasons, International Union of Pure and Applied Chemistry (IUPAC) recommends another nomenclature.

== History ==
The use of the letters K and L to denote X-rays originates in a 1911 paper by Charles Glover Barkla, titled The Spectra of the Fluorescent Röntgen Radiations ("Röntgen radiation" is an archaic name for "X-rays"). These letters, in the middle of the alphabet, were chosen over A and B to allow for the possibility that further series of X-rays, both more and less penetrating, would subsequently be discovered. By 1913, Henry Moseley had clearly differentiated two types of X-ray lines for each element, naming them α and β. In 1914, as part of his thesis, Ivar Malmer (sv:Ivar Malmer), a student of Manne Siegbahn, discovered that the α and β lines were not single lines, but doublets. In 1916, Siegbahn published this result in the journal Nature, using what would come to be known as the Siegbahn notation.

== Correspondence between the Siegbahn and IUPAC notations ==
The table below shows a few transitions and their initial and final levels.

Initial level	Final level	Siegbahn notation	IUPAC notation
K (1s_{1/2}^{−1})	L_{3} (2p_{3/2}^{−1})	Kα_{1}	K–L_{3}
K (1s_{1/2}^{−1})	L_{2} (2p_{1/2}^{−1})	Kα_{2}	K–L_{2}
K (1s_{1/2}^{−1})	M_{3} (3p_{3/2}^{−1})	Kβ_{1}	K–M_{3}
K (1s_{1/2}^{−1})	M_{2} (3p_{1/2}^{−1})	Kβ_{3}	K–M_{2}
L_{3} (2p_{3/2}^{−1})	M_{5} (3d_{5/2}^{−1})	Lα_{1}	L_{3}–M_{5}
L_{3} (2p_{3/2}^{−1})	M_{4} (3d_{3/2}^{−1})	Lα_{2}	L_{3}–M_{4}
L_{2} (2p_{1/2}^{−1})	M_{4} (3d_{3/2}^{−1})	Lβ_{1}	L_{2}–M_{4}
M_{5} (3d_{5/2}^{−1})	N_{7} (4f_{7/2}^{−1})	Mα_{1}	M_{5}–N_{7}

== See also ==
- Characteristic X-ray
- Moseley's law
- X-ray notation
