= Auger effect =

Physical phenomenon

Two views of the Auger process using the Bohr model of the atom. (a) illustrates sequentially the steps involved in Auger deexcitation. An incident electron (or photon) creates a core hole in the 1s level. An electron from the 2s level fills in the 1s hole, and the transition energy is imparted to a 2p electron, which is emitted. The final atomic state thus has two holes, one in the 2s orbital and the other in the 2p orbital. (b) illustrates the same process using X-ray notation, KL_{1}L_{2,3}.

The Auger effect is a physical phenomenon in which atoms eject electrons. It occurs when an inner-shell vacancy in an atom is filled by an electron, releasing energy that causes the emission of another electron from a different shell of the same atom.

When a core electron is removed, leaving a vacancy, an electron from a higher energy level may fall into the vacancy, resulting in a release of energy. For light atoms (Z<12), this energy is most often transferred to a valence electron which is subsequently ejected from the atom. This second ejected electron is called an Auger electron. For heavier atomic nuclei, the release of the energy in the form of an emitted photon becomes gradually more probable.

== Effect ==
Upon ejection, the kinetic energy of the Auger electron corresponds to the difference between the energy of the initial electronic transition into the vacancy and the ionization energy for the electron shell from which the Auger electron was ejected. These energy levels depend on the type of atom and the chemical environment in which the atom was located.

Auger electron spectroscopy involves the emission of Auger electrons by bombarding a sample with either X-rays or energetic electrons and measures the intensity of Auger electrons that result as a function of the Auger electron energy. The resulting spectra can be used to determine the identity of the emitting atoms and some information about their environment.

Auger recombination is a similar Auger effect which occurs in semiconductors. An electron and electron hole (electron-hole pair) can recombine, giving up their energy to an electron in the conduction band, increasing its energy. The reverse effect is known as impact ionization.

The Auger effect can impact biological molecules such as DNA. Following the K-shell ionization of the component atoms of DNA, Auger electrons are ejected, leading to damage to its sugar-phosphate backbone.

== Discovery ==
The Auger emission process was observed and published in 1922 by Lise Meitner, an Austrian-Swedish physicist, as a side effect in her competitive search for the nuclear beta electrons with the British physicist Charles Drummond Ellis.

The French physicist Pierre Victor Auger independently discovered it in 1923 upon analysis of a Wilson cloud chamber experiment and it became the central part of his PhD work. High-energy X-rays were applied to ionize gas particles and observe photoelectric electrons. The observation of electron tracks that were independent of the frequency of the incident photon suggested a mechanism for electron ionization that was caused by an internal conversion of energy from a radiationless transition. Further investigation and theoretical work using elementary quantum mechanics and transition rate/transition probability calculations showed that the effect was a radiationless effect more than an internal conversion effect.

== See also ==
- Auger therapy
- Charge carrier generation and recombination
- Characteristic X-ray
- Coster–Kronig transition
- Electron capture
- Radiative Auger effect
