= Peter Schattschneider =

Austrian physicist (born 1950)

- Born: 1950 (age 75–76)
- Citizenship: Austrian
- Education: Vienna University of Technology (PhD)
- Known for: MDFF, EMCD
- Scientific career
- Fields: Electron microscopy
- Workplaces: Vienna University of Technology
- Thesis: The determination of lattice constants of binary alloys from X-ray diffraction profiles (1976)
- Website: www.ustem.tuwien.ac.at/staff/schattschneider/EN/

Peter Schattschneider (born 1950 in Vienna) is an Austrian physicist and science-fiction writer, a retired professor at the Institute of Solid State Physics and a staff member of the USTEM special unit of the Vienna University of Technology. His research focuses on electron microscopy, specifically on electron energy loss spectroscopy and the inelastic interactions between electrons and matter. He is also interested in the history of physics, the science in science fiction, and the role of science in society. His group was responsible for the discovery of electron magnetic circular dichroism in 2006.

== Life ==
Peter Schattschneider completed his diploma degree in Physics in 1973 at the Vienna University of Technology, with a thesis entitled X-ray diffusion profiles in thin layers (German: Röntgenographische Bestimmung von Diffusionsprofilen in dünnen Schichten). In 1976 he successfully defended his PhD thesis on The determination of lattice constants of binary alloys from X-ray diffraction profiles (German: Die Ermittlung von Gitterkonstantenspektren binärer Legierungen aus Röntgenbeugungsprofilen) at the same university. From 1974 to 1977 he was also enrolled at the University of Vienna where he obtained a mag. rer. nat. degree in the college teaching of Physics and Mathematics. After working for a few years on air- and spaceborn sensors in a private engineering enterprise, he returned to his alma mater in 1980 as an assistant in the Institute for Applied and Technical Physics, where he became Assistant Professor in 1988.

In 1978 he published his first Science Fiction story (Rechtsbrecher) and afterwards has published other stories in Anthologies and Magazines.

From 1992 to 1993, he worked at the CNRS (Centre Nationale de la Recherche Scientifique) in Paris. Since 1995 he has been an invited professor at the École Centrale Paris. From 2000 to 2006 he was the head of the newly established University Service for Transmission Electron Microscopy at the Vienna University of Technology. Although he officially retired in 2015, he is still an active researcher. In October 2016 he received a decoration from the Vienna University of Technology for "his research on electron energy loss spectroscopy and the development of the theoretical foundations in the fields of ELNES, EMCD and most recently electron vortex beams".

In 2024, he experimentally simulated the Terrell effect for the first time.

== Awards ==
- 1981: Theodor Körner Prize for his work on EELS.
- 1992: Kurd-Laßwitz-Preis for the short story Pflegeleicht
- 1995: Kurd-Laßwitz-Preis for the short story Brief aus dem Jenseits

== Works ==
=== As author ===
Novels

- Singularitäten. Ein Episodenroman im Umfeld schwarzer Löcher. Suhrkamp, Frankfurt/M. 1984, ISBN 3-518-37521-0.
- Hell Fever – Höllische Spiele. Science-Fiction novel. Hinstorff Verlag, Rostock. 2019, ISBN 978-3-356-02276-6.
- The Exodus Incident. Science-Fiction novel. Springer. 2021, ISBN 978-3-030-70018-8

Short stories

- Zeitstopp. Science-Fiction-Geschichten (Phantastische Bibliothek; vol. 76). Suhrkamp, Frankfurt/M. 1982, ISBN 3-518-37319-6.
- Selbstgespräch mit Protoplasma. Erzählungen aus der Zukunft. Verlag im Waldgut, Frauenfeld 2009, ISBN 978-3-03-740384-6 (with an epilogue by Franz Rottensteiner).

Non-fiction books

- Fundamentals of inelastic electron scattering. Springer, Wien 1986, ISBN 3-211-81937-1.

=== As editor ===
- Science Fiction - Werkzeug oder Sensor einer technisierten Welt? Vortragsreihe. EDFC, Passau 1995 (with Karlheinz Steinmüller)
- Linear and chiral dichroism in the electron microscope. Pan Stanford, Singapore 2012, ISBN 9789814267489

== Literature ==
- Franz Rottensteiner: Peter Schattschneider. Das Spiel mit der Wirklichkeit, in: Franz Rottensteiner: Im Labor der Visionen. Anmerkungen zur phantastischen Literatur. 19 Aufsätze und Vorträge aus den Jahren 2000–2012, Verlag Dieter van Reeken, Lüneburg 2013, ISBN 978-3-940679-72-7, p. 189–198.
- Günter Zettl: Interview mit Peter Schattschneider, in: Science Fiction Times, 26th year, 1984, issue 9, p. 5–8.
