= Micro-X-ray fluorescence =

Micro x-ray fluorescence (μXRF) is an elemental analysis technique that relies on the same principles as x-ray fluorescence (XRF). Synchrotron X-rays may be used to provide elemental imaging with biological samples. The spatial resolution diameter of micro x-ray fluorescence is many orders of magnitude smaller than that of conventional XRF. While a smaller excitation spot can be achieved by restricting x-ray beam using a pinhole aperture, this method blocks much of the x-ray flux which has an adverse effect on the sensitivity of trace elemental analysis. Two types of x-ray optics, polycapillary and doubly curved crystal focusing optics, are able to create small focal spots of just a few micrometers in diameter. By using x-ray optics, the irradiation of the focal spot is much more intense and allows for enhanced trace element analysis and better resolution of small features. Micro x-ray fluorescence using x-ray optics has been used in applications such as forensics, small feature evaluations, elemental mapping, mineralogy, electronics, multi-layered coating analysis, micro-contamination detection, film and plating thickness, biology and environment.

== Application in forensic science ==
Micro x-ray fluorescence is among the newest technologies used to detect fingerprints. It is a new visualization technique which rapidly reveals the elemental composition of a sample by irradiating it with a thin beam of X-rays without disturbing the sample. It was discovered recently by scientists at the Los Alamos National Laboratory. The newly discovered technique was then first revealed at the 229th national meeting of the American Chemical Society (March, 2005). This new discovery could prove to be very beneficial to the law enforcement world, because it is expected that μXRF will be able to detect the most complex molecules in fingerprints.

Michael Bernstein of the American Chemical Society describes how the process works "Salts such as sodium chloride and potassium chloride excreted in sweat are sometimes present in detectable quantities in fingerprints. Using μXRF, the researchers showed that they could detect the sodium, potassium and chlorine from such salts. And since these salts are deposited along the patterns present in a fingerprint, an image of the fingerprint can be visualized producing an elemental image for analysis." This basically means that we can “see” a fingerprint because the salts are deposited mainly along the patterns present in a fingerprint.

Since μXRF technology uses X-ray technology to detect fingerprints, instead of traditional techniques, the image comes out much clearer. Traditional fingerprints are performed by a technique using powders, liquids or vapors to add color to the fingerprint so it can be distinguished. But sometimes this process may alter the fingerprint or may not be able to detect some of the more complex molecules.

Another μXRF application in forensics is GSR (gunshot residue) determination. Some specific elements, as antimony, barium and lead, can be identified on a cotton passed on the hands and clothes of the suspect of using a gun.
