= X-ray notation =

Method of labeling atomic orbitals

X-ray notation is a method of labeling atomic orbitals that grew out of X-ray science. Also known as IUPAC notation, it was adopted by the International Union of Pure and Applied Chemistry in 1991 as a simplification of the older Siegbahn notation. In X-ray notation, every principal quantum number is given a letter associated with it. In many areas of physics and chemistry, atomic orbitals are described with spectroscopic notation (1s, 2s, 2p, 3s, 3p, etc.), but the more traditional X-ray notation is still used with most X-ray spectroscopy techniques including AES and XPS.

== Conversion ==
Conversion
Quantum numbers				Atomic notation	X-ray notation
$n$	$\ell$	$s$	$j$	Atomic notation	X-ray notation
1	0	1/2	1/2	1s_{1/2}	K_{1}
2	0	1/2	1/2	2s_{1/2}	L_{1}
2	1	1/2	1/2	2p_{1/2}	L_{2}
2	1	1/2	3/2	2p_{3/2}	L_{3}
3	0	1/2	1/2	3s_{1/2}	M_{1}
3	1	1/2	1/2	3p_{1/2}	M_{2}
3	1	1/2	3/2	3p_{3/2}	M_{3}
3	2	1/2	3/2	3d_{3/2}	M_{4}
3	2	1/2	5/2	3d_{5/2}	M_{5}
4	0	1/2	1/2	4s_{1/2}	N_{1}
4	1	1/2	1/2	4p_{1/2}	N_{2}
4	1	1/2	3/2	4p_{3/2}	N_{3}
4	2	1/2	3/2	4d_{3/2}	N_{4}
4	2	1/2	5/2	4d_{5/2}	N_{5}
4	3	1/2	5/2	4f_{5/2}	N_{6}
4	3	1/2	7/2	4f_{7/2}	N_{7}

== Uses ==
- X-ray sources are classified by the type of material and orbital used to generate them. For example, Cu_{Kα} X-rays are emitted from the K orbital of copper.
- X-ray absorption is reported as which orbital absorbed the x-ray photon. In EXAFS and XMCD the L-edge or the L absorption edge is the point where the L orbital begins to absorb x-rays.
- Auger peaks are identified with three orbital definitions, for example KL_{1}L_{2}. In this case, K represents the hole that is initially present at the core level, L_{1} the initial state of the electron that relaxes down into the core level hole, and L_{2} the initial energy state of the emitted electron.

== See also ==
- Siegbahn notation for the names of spectral lines used in X-ray spectroscopy
- Spectroscopic notation
- Term symbol notation
