= AAAS Award for Scientific Freedom and Responsibility =

Award in science and engineering

The AAAS Award for Scientific Freedom and Responsibility is given by the American Association for the Advancement of Science and honours scientists and engineers whose exemplary actions, often taken at significant personal cost, have served to foster scientific freedom and responsibility and increased scientific awareness throughout the world. According to the AAAS, exemplary actions include "acting to protect the public's health, safety or welfare; focusing public attention on important potential impacts of science and technology on society by their responsible participation in public policy debates."

== History ==
The establishment of this new Award for Scientific Freedom and Responsibility was announced by AAAS executive officer William D. Carey on 23 October 1980. The award, presented for the first time at the 1982 AAAS Annual Meeting in Washington, DC, consisted of a plaque and a cash prize of $1,000.

== Recipients ==
- 1982 - Paul Berg, Maxine Singer, Norton Zinder, Morris H. Baslow
- 1983 - Anatoly Koryagin, Jose Westerkamp
- 1985 - Werner A. Baum
- 1986 - Colegio Medico de Chile, Victor Paschkis
- 1987 - Stanley L. Weinberg, Norman D. Newell, Francisco J. Ayala
- 1988 - Richard L. Garwin, Roger M. Boisjoly
- 1989 - Robert L. Sprague, Natural Resources Defense Council
- 1990 - Matthew S. Meselson
- 1991 - Adrian R. Morrison
- 1992 - Inez Austin
- 1993 - Daniel L. Albritton, Robert T. Watson
- 1994 - June E. Osborn, Mathilde Krim
- 1995 - Vil Mirzayanov
- 1996 - Daniel Callahan
- 1997 - Salim Kheirbek
- 1998 - JoAnn Burkholder
- 1999 - Joel L. Lebowitz
- 2000 - Alexander Nikitin
- 2001 - Howard K. Schachman
- 2002 - L. Dennis Smith
- 2003 - Walter Reich
- 2004 - rDNA Advisory Committee
- 2005 - David Michaels
- 2006 - Eugenie Scott, Dover High School Science Department, and R. Wesley McCoy
- 2007 - James Hansen
- 2008 - Drummond Rennie
- 2009 - Nancy Olivieri
- 2010 - Elizabeth Loftus
- 2011 - J. David Jentsch, Edythe D. London, and Dario Ringach
- 2012 - Kiyoshi Kurokawa
- 2013 - Hoosen Coovadia
- 2014 - Omid Kokabee
- 2015 - Jean Maria Arrigo
- 2016 - Kurt Gottfried
- 2017 - Award date adjusted – see 2018
- 2018 - Mark Edwards
- 2019 - Channa Jayasumana, Sarath Gunatilake
- 2020 - Erin Kimmerle
- 2021 - Ricardo Galvão
- 2022 - Ronald W. Jones
- 2023 - Peter Hotez
- 2024 - Eric Stover
- 2025 - Encieh Erfani
- 2026 - Morteza Mahmoudi

== See also ==
- AAAS Award for Science Diplomacy
- AAAS Philip Hauge Abelson Prize
- AAAS Prize for Behavioral Science Research
- Newcomb Cleveland Prize
