= Zehra Sayers =

Turkish scientist

- Born: 25 September 1953 (age 72)
- Education: University of Hamburg (Habilitation); University of London (PhD); Boğaziçi University
- Spouse(s): Colin Sayers; Ahmet Evin
- Awards: BBC 100 Women (2019); AAAS Award for Science Diplomacy (as part of a five-scientist group, 2019)
- Scientific career
- Workplaces: Open University; University of Uppsala; European Molecular Biology Laboratory; Sabancı University
- Thesis: Random Walk Behaviour of Amoeba proteus in Response to Electric Fields and Other Stimuli (1978)
- Website: people.sabanciuniv.edu/~zehra

Zehra Sayers (born 25 September 1953) is a Turkish-British structural biologist. She has previously served as Interim President of the Sabancı University (February–November 2018) and co-chaired the scientific advisory committee for Synchrotron-Light for Experimental Science and Applications in the Middle East (SESAME). She was part of a five-scientist group that received the AAAS Award for Science Diplomacy in 2019. She holds Turkish and British citizenship.

== Early life and education ==
Sayers was born in Turkey. She studied physics at Boğaziçi University in Istanbul. For her postgraduate studies Sayers moved to the United Kingdom. In 1978 she earned a doctorate for research done at King's College London GKT School of Medical Education, the degree was awarded by the University of London. Sayers worked as a postdoctoral researcher in the Open University and the Wallenberg Laboratory, Uppsala University. In 1986 she was the first woman staff scientist to be appointed to the Hamburg outstation of the European Molecular Biology Laboratory, where she used synchrotron radiation to study cytoskeletal proteins and chromatin. Whilst working in Germany she obtained her habilitation in 1996 with a thesis from the University of Hamburg.

== Research and career ==
In 1998 Sayers returned to Turkey, joining the founding faculty of Sabancı University as the partner of Ahmet Evin. Established by the Turkish industrial and financial conglomerate Hacı Ömer Sabancı Holding A.Ş., Sabancı University was the first and only university where Sayers served as faculty member: she was Director of the Foundation Development Program in 2010 and Interim President from February to November 2018. Her research has considered recombinant protein production, and has considered the structure of chromatin fibres and filamentous proteins. She looks to identify the relationship between structure and function in macromolecules. At Sabancı University, Sayers was involved in undergraduate teaching, developing an interdisciplinary, liberal arts, curriculum for science teaching. She became professor emerita in 2022.

Sayers became involved with the Synchrotron-Light for Experimental Science and Applications in the Middle East (SESAME) project since 2000. The light source was inaugurated in 2017 by Abdullah II of Jordan. She believes that synchrotron light sources are an effective way to integrate scientists from different disciplines and nationalities. During her time as Co-chair of the Scientific Advisory Committee, more than 100 young scientists were trained to use the synchrotron radiation. She held her position as Co-chair of the Scientific Advisory Committee of SESAME from 2002 to 2018. Sayers has worked as an advisor for the Turkish Accelerator Center Project, supported by the Turkish state. Together with Eliezer Rabinovici, she spoke about the international collaborations that are part of SESAME at TEDxCERN in 2013.

== Selected publications ==
- Ozturk, Levent; Yazici, Mustafa Atilla; Yucel, Cemal; Torun, Ayfer; Cekic, Cemal; Bagci, Ahmet; Ozkan, Hakan; Braun, Hans-Joachim; Sayers, Zehra; Cakmak, Ismail (2006). "Concentration and localization of zinc during seed development and germination in wheat". Physiologia Plantarum. 128: 144–152. doi:10.1111/j.1399-3054.2006.00737.x.
- Sayers, Zehra; Koch, Michel H.J.; Whitburn, Susan B.; Meek, Keith M.; Elliott, Gerald F.; Harmsen, Arnold (1982). "Synchrotron X-ray diffraction study of corneal stroma". Journal of Molecular Biology. 160 (4): 593–607. doi:10.1016/0022-2836(82)90317-5. PMID 7175938.
- Meek, Keith M.; Elliott, Gerald F.; Sayers, Zehra; Whitburn, Susan B.; Koch, Michel H.J. (1981). "Interpretation of the meridional X-ray diffraction pattern from collagen fibrils in corneal stroma". Journal of Molecular Biology. 149 (3): 477–488. doi:10.1016/0022-2836(81)90482-4. PMID 7310887.

== Awards and honours ==
She was awarded the EuroScience Rammal Award in 2017, which recognised her contributions to building the scientific programme of SESAME. In 2019 Sayers became the first person of joint Turkish and British citizenship to win the AAAS Award for Science Diplomacy, as part of a group of five scientists receiving the award for their contributions to SESAME. Later that year she was named as one of the BBC 100 Women in 2019.
