= Jianguo =

Jianguo (simplified Chinese: 建国; traditional Chinese: 建國) is a Chinese term meaning "nation-building". It may refer to:

== People ==
- Chen Jianguo (born 1945), Chinese politician
- Donald Trump, colloquially referred to as Comrade Chuan Jianguo, "Nation Builder Trump"
- He Jianguo (born 1951), Chinese artist
- Jiang Jianguo (born 1956), Chinese politician
- Li Jianguo (born 1946), Chinese politician
- Liu Chien-kuo (born 1969), Taiwanese politician
- Jianguo Liu (born 1963), Chinese ecologist
- Pang Chien-kuo (1953–2022), Taiwanese politician
- Qi Jianguo (born 1952), Chinese general
- Sui Jianguo, Chinese artist
- Sun Jianguo (born 1952), Chinese admiral
- Jianguo Wu, Chinese ecologist
- Xu Jianguo (1903–1977), Chinese politician

== Other ==
- Jianguo Road (disambiguation)
- Jianguo, Gucheng County, Hebei, a town in Gucheng County, Hebei

== See also ==
- Chienkuo Technology University, in Changhua, Taiwan
- Kenkoku University, defunct university in modern-day Changchun, China
- Baekdu Hagwon, South Korean international school in Osaka, Japan
- Konkuk University, South Korean university with campuses in Seoul and Changju
- Taipei Municipal Jianguo High School, in Taipei, Taiwan
- Taiwan Independence Party, known as the Jianguo Dang, or Nation-building Party, in Chinese
