= Thomas M. Connelly =

American business executive (born 1952)

Thomas M. Connelly Jr.
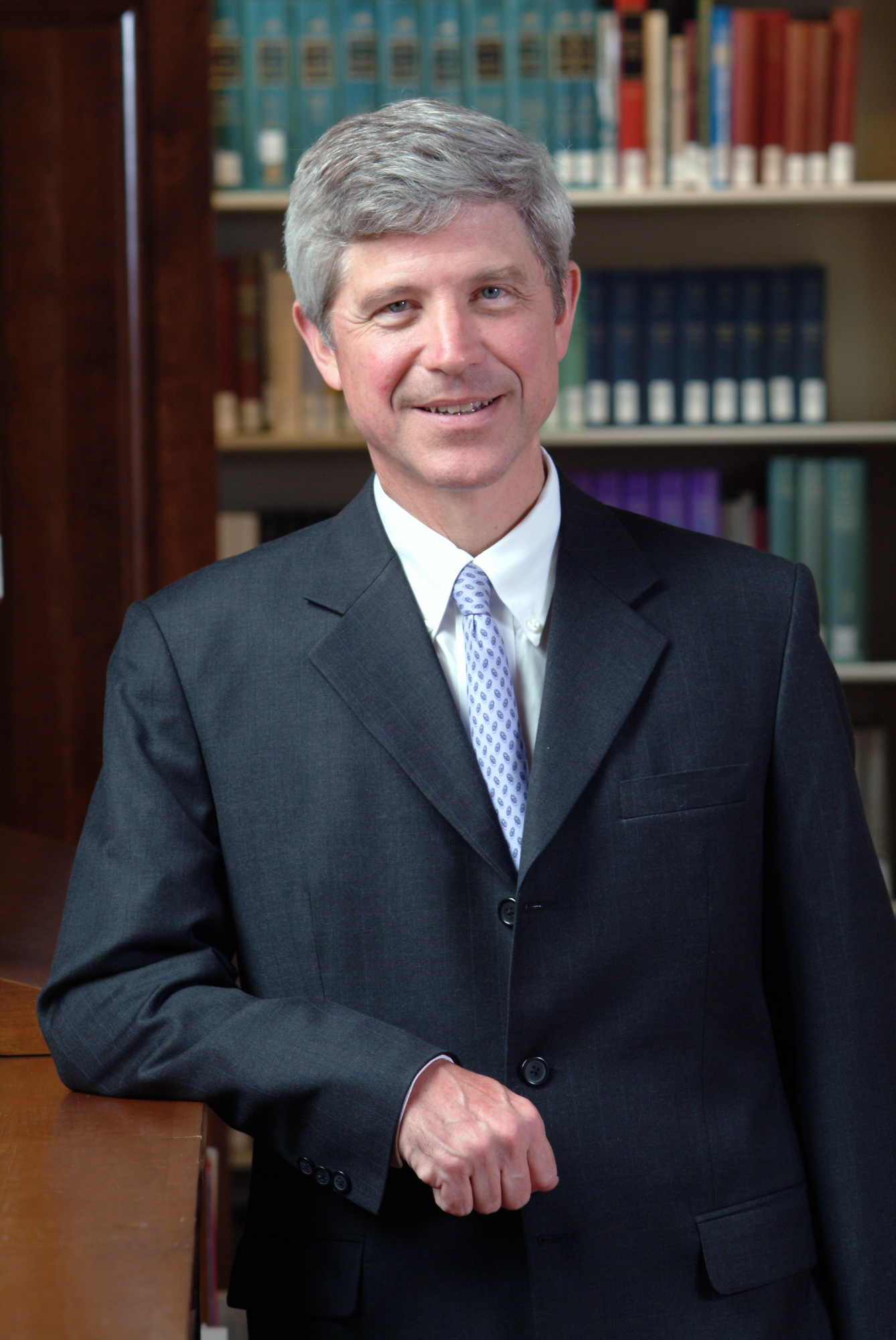
- Born: June 1952 (age 74); Toledo, Ohio, U.S.
- Education: Princeton University (B.S., M.S.); University of Cambridge (Ph.D.)
- Occupation: Business executive
- Title: Chief executive officer and executive director of the American Chemical Society
- Spouse: Patricia Connelly

Thomas M. Connelly Jr. (born June 1952) is an American business executive with a focus on chemical engineering. In February 2015, he succeeded Madeleine Jacobs as chief executive officer and executive director of the American Chemical Society.

In November 2014, E. I. du Pont de Nemours and Company announced that Connelly was retiring from his position as executive vice president and chief innovation officer after 36 years with the company.

== Education ==
Connelly studied at Princeton University earning degrees in Chemical Engineering and Economics in 1974. He then attended the University of Cambridge as a Winston Churchill Scholar, where he received a Ph.D. in chemical engineering.

== DuPont ==
Connelly was employed by E. I. du Pont de Nemours and Company for 36 years. He joined the company in 1977 as a research engineer at the DuPont Experimental Station in Wilmington, Delaware. He had assignments in Kentucky and West Virginia before starting his overseas assignments. He had positions in England, Switzerland and China – the final position with responsibility for DuPont's Asia Pacific businesses. He then returned to Wilmington in 1999 and was named vice president and general manager of DuPont Fluoroproducts. He was named senior vice-president of research and Chief Science and Technology Officer in 2001. He was promoted to Executive Vice President, the Chief Innovation Officer and a member of the Office of the Chief Executives of DuPont in 2006. In this position, he had responsibility for DuPont's Applied BioSciences, Nutrition & Health, Performance Polymers and Packaging & Industrial Polymers businesses. He also had responsibility for Integrated Operations which includes Operations, Sourcing & Logistics and Engineering. DuPont announced he was retiring from the company in 2014.

== Other positions and honors ==
He is a member of the Department of Chemical Engineering Advisory Committee of Princeton University. As part of the Chemical Heritage Foundation "Heritage Day 2005" ceremonies, Connelly received the 2005 Award for Executive Excellence of the Commercial Development and Marketing Association (CDMA).
