= Chinese given name =

Given name in Chinese characters

Chinese given names (Chinese: 名; pinyin: míng) are the given names adopted by speakers of the Chinese language, both in majority-Sinophone countries and among the Chinese diaspora.

== Description ==
Chinese given names are almost always made up of one or – usually – two characters and are written after the surname. Therefore, Wei (伟) of the Zhang (张) family is called "Zhang Wei" and not "Wei Zhang". In contrast to the relative paucity of Chinese surnames, given names can theoretically include any of the Chinese language's 100,000 characters and contain almost any meaning.

It is considered disrespectful in China to name a child after an older relative, and both bad practice and disadvantageous for the child's fortune to copy the names of celebrities or famous historical figures. A common name like "Liu Xiang" might be possessed by tens of thousands of people, but generally they were not named for the athlete. An even stronger naming taboo was current during the time of the Chinese Empire, when other bearers of the emperor's name could be gravely punished for not having changed their name upon his ascension. Similarly, it is quite rare to see Chinese children bear the same name as their fathers – the closest examples typically include small differences, such as the former Premier Li Peng's son, who is named Li Xiaopeng.

Since the Three Kingdoms era, some families have had generation names worked out long in advance, and all members (or all male members) of a generation have the same first character in their two-character given names. In other families there is a small number of generational names which are cycled through. Together, these generation names may be a poem about the hope or history of the family. This tradition has largely fallen into abeyance since the Communist victory in the Civil War; the "Ze" (泽) in Mao Zedong was the fourteenth generation of such a cycle, but he chose to ignore his family's generational poem to name his own sons. A similar practice was observed regarding the stage names of Chinese opera performers: all the students entering a training academy in the same year would adopt the same first character in their new "given name". For example, as part of the class entering the National Drama School in 1933, Li Yuru adopted a name with the central character "jade" (玉).

There are also other conventions. It is frequently the case that children are given names based on gender stereotypes, with boys acquiring 'masculine' names implying strength or courage while girls receive 'feminine' names concerning beauty or flowers. Since doubled characters are considered diminutives in Chinese, many girls also receive names including a doubled pair of characters or two characters with identical pronunciation. A famous exception to this generally feminine practice is Yo-Yo Ma.

Apart from generational names, siblings' names are frequently related in other ways as well. For example, one son's name may include a character meaning "Sun" (阳 or 日) while his sister would have the character for "Moon" (月) or a character including the moon radical. It is also common to split modern Chinese words – which now usually consist of two characters of similar meaning both to each other and the full word – among a pair of children, such as Jiankang (健康, "healthy") appearing in the children's names as -jian (健, "strong") and -kang (康, "healthy").

Chinese personal names can also reflect periods of history. For example, many Chinese born during the Cultural Revolution have "revolutionary names" such as Qiangguo (强国, lit. "Strong Country" or "Strengthening the Country") or Dongfeng (东风, lit. "Eastern Wind"). In Taiwan, it was formerly common to incorporate one of the four characters of the name "Republic of China" (中華民國, Zhōnghuá Mínguó) into masculine names. Patriotic names remain common but are becoming less popular – 960,000 Chinese are currently named Jianguo (建国, lit. "Building the Country") but only a few thousand more are now being added each year.

Within families, adults rarely refer to each other by personal names. Adult relatives and children referring to adults generally use a family title such as "Big Sister", "Second Sister", "Third Sister", and so on. It is considered rude for a child to refer to parents by their given name, and this taboo is extended to all adult relatives.

When speaking of non-family social acquaintances, people are generally referred to by a title – for example, "Mister Zhang", "Mother Li" or "Chu's Wife". Personal names are used when referring to adult friends or to children and are typically spoken completely; if the given name is two characters long, it is almost never truncated. Another common way to reference someone in a friendly way is to call them "Old" (老, Lǎo) or "Little" (小, xiǎo) along with their surname.

Many people have a non-Chinese name (typically English) in addition to their Chinese names. For example, the Taiwanese politician Soong Chu-yu is also known as "James Soong". In the case of Christians, their Western names are often their baptismal names. In Hong Kong, it is common to list the names all together, beginning with the English given name, moving on to the Chinese surname, and then ending with the Chinese given name – for example, Alex Fong Chung-Sun. Among American-born and other overseas Chinese it is common practice to be referred to primarily by one's non-Chinese name, with the Chinese one relegated to alternate or middle name status. Recent immigrants, however, often use their Chinese name as their legal name and adopt a non-Chinese name for casual use only.

Proper use of pinyin romanization means treating a Chinese given name as a single word with no space between the letters of the two characters: for example, the common name 王秀英 is properly rendered either with its tone marks as Wáng Xiùyīng or without as Wang Xiuying, but should not be written as Wang Xiu Ying, Wang XiuYing, Wangxiuying, &c. The earlier Wade-Giles system accomplished the same effect by hyphenating the given name between the characters: for example, the same name would be written as Wang^{2} Hsiù^{4}-yīng^{1}. However, many Chinese do not follow these rules, romanizing their names with a space between each. This can cause non–Chinese-speakers to incorrectly take the names as divisible.

In regions where fortune-telling is more popular, many parents may name their children on the advice of literomancers. The advice are often given based on the number of strokes of the names or the perceived elemental value of the characters in relation to the child's birth time and personal elemental value; rarely on the sound of the name as there is no system of fortune-telling based on character pronunciations. In jurisdictions where it is possible, people may also choose to change their legal given name, or their children's names, in order to improve their fortune.

== Common Chinese names ==
As of 2007, the most common names in China were:

Rank	Surname	Given name	Pinyin romanization	Meaning	Number
1	黄	丽	Lì	Pretty, Graceful	290607
2	王	伟	Wěi	Big, Great	281568
3	王	芳	Fāng	Fragrance, Virtue	268268
4	李	伟	Wěi	Big, Great	260980
5	王	秀英	Xiùyīng	Outstanding Beauty, Elegant & Brave	246737
6	李	秀英	Xiùyīng	Outstanding Beauty, Elegant & Brave	244637
7	李	娜	Nà	[None] (Note: Nà itself is merely phonetic, although the same character pronounced as nuó forms a part of the words for "lithe", "graceful", and "willowy".)	244223
8	張	秀英	Xiùyīng	Outstanding Beauty, Elegant & Brave	236266
9	刘	伟	Wěi	Big, Great	234352
10	張	敏	Mǐn	Quick, Clever	233708
11	李	静	Jìng	Peaceful, Tranquil	232686
12	張	丽	Lì	Beautiful	232533
13	王	静	Jìng	Peaceful, Tranquil	231914
14	王	丽	Lì	Beautiful	226724
15	李	强	Qiáng	Strong, Better	223950
16	张	静	Jìng	Peaceful, Tranquil	221483
17	李	敏	Mǐn	Quick, Clever	213606
18	王	敏	Mǐn	Quick, Clever	213603
19	王	磊	Lěi	Mound of Rocks, Great	209757
20	李	军	Jūn	Army	199772
21	刘	洋	Yáng	Ocean	199642
22	王	勇	Yǒng	Brave	198720
23	张	勇	Yǒng	Brave	197859
24	王	艳	Yàn	Gorgeous	194371
25	李	杰	Jié	Outstanding, Heroic	191759
26	张	磊	Lěi	Mound of Rocks, Great	191065
27	王	强	Qiáng	Strong, Better	190266
28	王	军	Jūn	Army	189999
29	张	杰	Jié	Outstanding, Heroic	189117
30	李	娟	Juān	Beautiful, Bewitching	187701
31	张	艳	Yàn	Gorgeous	181752
32	张	涛	Tāo	Large Wave	177993
33	王	涛	Tāo	Large Wave	177978
34	李	明	Míng	Bright	177898
35	李	艳	Yàn	Gorgeous	176676
36	王	超	Chāo	Overleap, Surpass	174891
37	李	勇	Yǒng	Brave	173615
38	王	娟	Juān	Beautiful, Bewitching	171785
39	刘	杰	Jié	Outstanding, Heroic	166929
40	王	秀兰	Xiùlán	Beautiful Orchid, Elegant & Graceful	166111
41	李	霞	Xiá	Rosy Clouds, Mist	165189
42	刘	敏	Mǐn	Quick, Clever	164133
43	张	军	Jūn	Army	162773
44	李	丽	Lì	Beautiful	162497
45	张	强	Qiáng	Strong, Better	159914
46	王	平	Píng	Peaceful, Tranquil	155617
47	王	刚	Gāng	Hard, Strong	154600
48	王	杰	Jié	Outstanding, Heroic	154113
49	李	桂英	Guìyīng	Laurel & Beautiful, Brave	153218
50	刘	芳	Fāng	Fragrance, Virtue	152189

== See also ==
- Art name
- Chinese clan name
- Chinese nickname
- Chinese surname
- Courtesy name
- Generation name
- Japanese name
- American name
- Korean name
- Milk name
- Naming taboo
- Onomastics
- Posthumous name
- Russian name
- School name
- Temple name
- Vietnamese name
