= Animals and tobacco smoke =

Exposure of animals to tobacco smoke

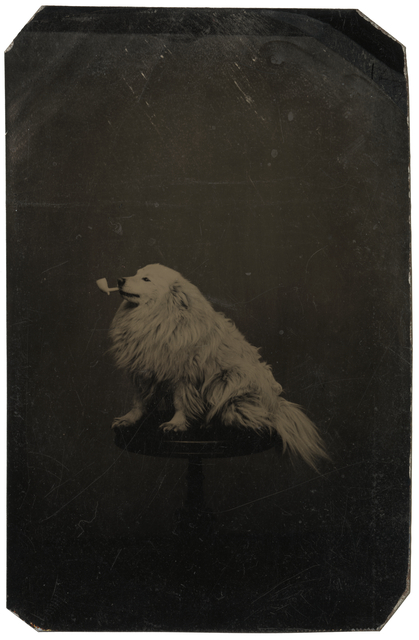
A dog sitting on a stool with a pipe in its mouth, c. 1875.

Animals are exposed to tobacco smoke and other cigarette by-products through their use as experimental subjects and through contact with smokers, as in the case of pets in houses where smoking takes place.

== Direct exposure in experimental settings ==
The first recorded attempts to artificially induce animal tumors through the application of tobacco products occurred in 1911. A 2004 series of monographs released by the International Agency for Research on Cancer, a part of the World Health Organisation, summarized research from the 1960s onwards about the carcinogenicity of tobacco on various laboratory animals.

=== Methods ===
As set out in the IARC monographs, the carcinogenicity of cigarette smoke is determined in two ways. The first is through the application of cigarette-smoke condensates to skin. Cigarette-smoke condensates are collected by passing smoke through cold traps and recovering the retained material. The cigarettes are usually machine-smoked and the material is washed from the traps using a volatile substance such as acetone, which is then removed. Many of the procedures for collecting this cigarette-smoke-condensate have not yet been standardized across laboratories, including how the condensate is stored, in what numbers and fashion the cigarettes are smoked, and the type of solvent used. Once the condensate is collected, it is painted onto the skin of the animal test subjects, which are then examined at set intervals to assess the growth of tumors.

The second method, as described by the IARC monographs, used to measure the carcinogenicity of cigarette smoke to animals is by exposing them to mainstream cigarette smoke. The IARC monographs define mainstream cigarette smoke as that which is emitted by the mouth end of the cigarette and therefore the smoke that human smokers would be exposed to most. The IARC monographs describe the methods and equipment that scientists have developed to make more effective and standardize the deliverance of mainstream cigarette smoke. These devices vary between whole-body and nose-only exposure, but typically involve machine smoked cigarette smoke being pumped into a small chamber that contains the animal test subjects. A variety of factors differentiate the experience of a human smoker from these animal test subjects'. Human smokers inhale smoke voluntarily and therefore do so more deeply than do animal test subjects which typically adopt short, shallow breaths when exposed to smoke. The animal test subjects, primarily rodents and dogs, also have significantly morphologically different upper respiratory system from humans. Despite these variables, the doses of smoke administered to these animals can be determined by examining tissue and blood samples. Dogs, which cannot be exposed to cigarette smoke via inhalation chambers as easily as can small rodents, require different methods of cigarette smoke exposure. These methods include thracheostomy, in which smoke is pumped through a tube directly into a hole cut in the dog's throat, or through a mask fitted to the dog's face.

==== Results ====
The IARC monographs concluded that the application of cigarette-smoke condensates onto the skin of mice induces tumors, of both benign and malignant variety. Although the carcinogenicity of tobacco smoke was first established in humans, various types of animals have also been exposed to tobacco smoke inhalation in attempts to yield further experimental proof and control for various experimental factors, including types of tobacco and levels of exposure, which would be considered unethical in human studies. The IARC monographs, referencing studies which used various methods of smoke inhalation, concluded that a significantly greater number of pulmonary tumors occurred among mice exposed to smoke than those in the control groups. Since the 1960s, the animal most used in testing the carcinogenicity of tobacco smoke has been the Syrian Golden Hamster due to its resistance to pulmonary infections and the infrequency with which it spontaneously develops pulmonary tumors. According to the IARC monographs these studies have proven, and repeatedly confirmed, the carcinogenicity of tobacco smoke for hamsters.

Some studies referenced in the IARC monographs found that certain, but not all, groups of rats exposed to mainstream smoke were significantly more likely to develop lung tumors. The IARC monographs also referenced studies involving rabbits and dogs that were much less conclusive. The authors, however, cited various experimental limitations, such as small test or control groups and missing data, that could account for the lack of conclusive results.

=== Effects of environmental tobacco smoke ===
Multiple studies have also been conducted to determine the carcinogenicity of environmental tobacco to animals. These studies typically fall under the categories of simulated environmental tobacco, administering condensates of sidestream smoke, or observational studies of cancer among pets.

=== Simulated environmental tobacco smoke ===
To study the consequences of passive smoking, scientists expose animals to sidestream smoke, that which emanates from the cigarette's burning cone and through its paper, or a combination of mainstream and sidestream smoke. The IARC monographs conclude that mice with prolonged exposure to simulated second-hand smoke, that is six hours a day, five days a week, for five months with a subsequent four-month interval before dissection, will have significantly higher inicidence and multiplicity of lung tumors than with control groups.

==== Condensates of sidestream smoke ====
The IARC monographs concluded that sidestream smoke condensates had a significantly higher carcinogenic effect upon mice than did mainstream smoke condensates.

==== Observational studies in pets ====
Second-hand smoke is recognized as a risk factor for cancer in pets. A study conducted by the Tufts University School of Veterinary Medicine and the University of Massachusetts Amherst linked the occurrence of feline oral cancer to exposure to environmental tobacco smoke through an overexpression of the p53 gene. Another study conducted at the same universities concluded that cats living with a smoker were more likely to get feline lymphoma; the risk increased with the duration of exposure to second-hand smoke and the number of smokers in the household. A study by Colorado State University researchers, looking at cases of canine lung cancer, was generally inconclusive, though the authors reported a weak relation for lung cancer in dogs exposed to environmental tobacco smoke. The number of smokers within the home, the number of packs smoked in the home per day, and the amount of time that the dog spent within the home had no effect on the dog's risk for lung cancer.

In 1990, a tobacco-industry researcher in Germany proposed a study of the effects on animals of lifetime exposure to second-hand smoke. The proposed study was blocked by Philip Morris, as described in an internal company report:

PM [Philip Morris] recently succeeded in blocking Adlkofer's plan to conduct lifetime animal inhalation study of sidestream smoke. (... an INBIFO study has shown that in 90-day inhalation test, no non-reversible changes has [sic] been detected. In a lifetime study, the results were almost certain to be less favorable. Based on the analysis, the other members of the German industry agreed that the proposed study should not proceed).

A 2008 study conducted by the Henry Ford Health System found that given information about the harmful effects of passive smoking on their pets, 28.4% of pet owners who smoke would be motivated to quit, 8.7% would ask those who live with them to quit, and 14.2% would stop smoking indoors.

== Animal nicotine poisoning ==
Animals like dogs, cats, squirrels, and other small animals are affected not only by second-hand smoke inhalation, but also nicotine poisoning. Domestic pets, especially dogs, usually fall ill when owners leave nicotine products like cigarette butts, chewing tobacco, or nicotine gum within reach of the animal. Littered cigarette butts from smokers can be a problem for small animals which mistake them for food if they find them, particularly in urban environments. Cigarette butts are the remains of a cigarette after smoking which contain the filter which is meant to contain tar, particles, and toxins from the cigarette such as ammonia, arsenic, benzene, turpentine and other toxins.

Cigarette butts can be found in high quantities as litter. It can take 18 months to 10 years for the filter to degrade. Although cigarette litter awareness campaigns encourage smokers to avoid littering and to even carry pocket ashtrays, cigarette butts rank number one on the list of worst litter problems in the U.S. This makes it easy for small animals like puppies, squirrels, and raccoons to find and unsuspectingly consume nicotine. A reported 4.5 trillion cigarette butts wind up as litter worldwide per year. Cigarette butts reportedly account for 30% of the waste items found on U.S. shorelines.

This can be a hazard to animals like seagulls and turtles because when placed in large bodies of water like oceans, the toxins of the cigarette butt can be detrimental to marine life. Researchers at San Diego State University claim that filter-tipped cigarette butts are toxic especially for marine and fresh-water fish. Even just one cigarette butt alone soaking in water for a day is hazardous enough to kill 50% of fish in a litre of water. Dolphins have the most blubber in the marine life and toxins concentrate there, thus dolphins especially are the most affected by the toxins.

The toxins of the cigarette butt can cause health problems in animals like vomiting, tremors and hypersalivation. Veterinary Medicine published a case of a 10-year-old female Labrador retriever ingesting cigarette butts. The Labrador vomited several times and had increased blood urea nitrogen, total protein, and albumin concentrations with hemolysis and lipemia also observed. Apomorphine hydrochloride and activated charcoal had to be administered along with other fluids. 5 days after the incident, the dog's health returned to normal. The toxic level of nicotine in a dog or cat is reported as 20–100 mg which is about one to five cigarettes.

A newer product available in some markets, nicotine dissolvables, contains about 1 mg of nicotine per pellet. Other products like Camel Strips which contain 0.6 mg of nicotine per strip and sticks. Though this nicotine content is low in comparison to a cigarette, these items can be more attractive to unwary small animals like puppies.

== Controversy between animal rights activists and the tobacco industry ==
Much controversy exists over animal testing especially with nicotine and tobacco products. Animal activism groups are especially vocal about claims of companies like Phillip Morris funding animal tobacco research. There has always been much tension between animal activists groups, and researchers and this became especially visible with the serious attack against a researcher. Edythe D. London, a UCLA professor leading a 3-year study was targeted by activists and her home was flooded by the Animal Liberation Front. A fire-bomb was also left in front of her house by the North American Animal Liberation. After the incident Edyth London wrote an article titled "Why I use animals in my research". In the article, London expressed an interest in solving the problem of addiction and offering help to those who need help in quitting their tobacco addiction. She did admit to being funded by Philip Morris USA and sees no problem with it.

On the Philip Morris website the company claims that they do not presently conduct internal research with the use of laboratory animals. They do fund external research, but claim to do so in a humane and responsible manner as shown by their accreditation by the Association for Assessment and Accreditation of Laboratory Animal Care.

In 2001, American Spirit claimed to have turned to cruelty-free cigarettes in which the company doesn't conduct cigarette testing using animals. This move was praised by animal activists groups and used to encourage other tobacco companies to follow the leadership of American Spirit.

The main argument of animal activists, besides the ethical treatment of animals, is there is no point in continuing to perform these experiments on animals to prove the detrimental effects of tobacco, which are already known. The Impact Press like claims that "in one experiment, vivisectors cut holes in beagles' throats and made them breathe concentrated cigarette smoke for an entire year". The group also claims that at the Oregon Regional Primate Research Center, the rhesus monkeys live in tight, metal cages and pregnant monkeys are exposed to nicotine. There is also disapproval by animal activists of a March of Dimes funded study in which nicotine was given to pregnant rats, and then the offspring were tested to see how they performed in a maze". Groups like PETA are using slogans like "Don't get burned by Philip Morris. They're using your money to hurt animals". PETA also claims that there is still a question as to the reliability of results from animal testing for tobacco studies. According to an article, federal regulatory and research agencies have almost 200 test methods which guarantee effectiveness in animal studies. The Interagency Coordinating Committee on the Validation of Alternative Methods exists to review these methods. Some researchers, however, continue to argue that there are longitudinal studies of cigarette-smoking which still need to be conducted, and that animal studies are not superfluous, but necessary.
