= Patti Strand =

American animal welfare advocate

- Citizenship: American
- Occupation: President of National Animal Interest Alliance
- Spouse: Rod Strand
- Website: naiaonline.org

Patti Strand is the founder of the National Animal Interest Alliance (NAIA), a broad-based, mainstream, nonprofit animal welfare organization dedicated to encouraging high standards of animal care and treatment, and to preserving the human animal bond. She is an author of books and articles and has served on numerous local, state and federal animal welfare advisory boards, committees and task force bodies.

== Background ==
Her articles and views on animal welfare and public policy have appeared in a wide variety of trade, professional and scientific magazines and lay publications, ranging from the Los Angeles Times, USA Today and the Washington Post to the AKC Gazette, Veterinary Forum, Wall Street Journal and the Journal of the American Veterinary Medical Association.

She has been a guest expert and panelist on dozens of radio talk shows including National Public Radio, the BBC and CBC; TV news shows including NBC, ABC, CBS and Fox News, and has been a featured speaker at conferences for zoos, state and national veterinary groups, physician groups, lab animal scientists, kennel clubs and federations; and agricultural, hunting and humane associations.

== Works and achievements ==
Patti Strand is actively involved in numerous animal organizations and some of her contributions and achievements are:

- Member of the American Kennel Club board of directors, 1995–2011
- Appointed by three consecutive US Secretaries of Agriculture to the National Wildlife Services Advisory Committee (NWSAC).
- "Dogdom's Woman of the Year" and Fido Award winner, the sport of dogs top award, in 1993. The award was given for her advocacy for responsible dog ownership and breeding.
- Author of numerous articles on dogs and animal issues including: Co-authoring the 1995 book, An Owner's Guide to the Dalmatian; and the 1992 book, The Hijacking of the Humane Movement: Animal Extremism, first book published in the US about animal rights extremism. Source book on the subject, featured at the 1993 National Conference of State Legislatures as a key resource for understanding contemporary animal issues.
- Featured speaker on national radio and television shows and at national conferences for the AVMA, for humane, medical, livestock and conservation associations, for boarding kennels and dog trainers and for AKC clubs and federations.
- President of NAIA which she co-founded in 1991. NAIA role is to promote responsible animal ownership and use, and to counter the misinformation of radical animal rights fundraising groups. NAIA is a leading media resource for all issues related to animals, animal welfare, animal rights and public policy.
- Founded NAIA Trust in 2001. NAIA Trust is the legislative counterpart to NAIA. NAIA Trust has tracked between 700 and 1000 bills during each of the last 4 years, actively working more than 100 of them and achieving success on the overwhelming majority of those bills.
- Dalmatian breeder with her husband Rod since 1969 under the kennel name Merry-Go-Round (MGR), owning, breeding the top winning Dalmatian of all time (Westminster Group I winner) and others including numerous group, specialty, Top 10 and Best in Show winners. Good temperament, health and sound movement have been their top priorities throughout the development of their bloodline.

== Criticism of animal rights ==
Strand is a critic of animal rights and has argued that the humane movement has been highjacked by animal rights extremists, "whose priority is neither the humane care of animals nor the prevention of cruelty to animals, but instead, the promotion of a revolutionary value system which redefined man’s relationship with animals. Animal rightists want to end man’s use of animals altogether."

In 1993, Strand co-authored Animal Rights and Wrongs: The Hijacking of the Humane Movement, which argues that the animal rights movement is an anti-democratic new age cult that seeks to eliminate man's total use of animal's including pets and private property. A criticism of the book is that Strand ignored the diversity of opinion amongst animal rights activists and failed to distinguish the animal rights movement from the environmental movement. Adrian R. Morrison a noted proponent of animal experimentation defended the book.

== Selected publications ==
- Animal Rights and Wrongs: The Hijacking of the Humane Movement (1993)
- The Dalmatian: An Owner's Guide to a Happy Healthy Pet (2007)
