= Morris H. Baslow =

American marine biologist

Morris H. Baslow (born 1933) is a co-recipient of the 1982 AAAS Award for Scientific Freedom and Responsibility for his role as Whistleblower in a dispute between the EPA, Consolidated Edison and Con-Ed's consulting firm.

In 1974 Baslow was a senior scientist at the engineering and consulting firm of Lawler, Matuusky & Skelly. In 1978 Baslow investigated whether there were any significant relationships between the population of different species of fish in the Hudson River and the characteristics of the river, including temperature of the water. This research led to a serious disagreement between Baslow and his supervisor. Baslow's research indicated that temperature was the main factor that determined fish growth rates and population size, while LMS and their client Con Edison, said that population density was the key factor controlling the fish population in the Hudson. If Baslow was right, the utility company would need to install costly cooling towers. Baslow tried to persuade his superiors for two years to tell the whole truth about his data. In October 1979 Baslow was fired from his job at LMS. A short time later he sent seventy-one company documents to the EPA, the Federal Energy Regulatory Commission and the Justice Department. LMS sued Baslow for stealing documents, and Baslow counter-sued, citing the Clean Water Act. One year later all charges were dropped.

In 1982 Baslow wrote a book publishing the results of his research: "The Hudson River Ecosystem: A Case Study."
