= Lynn Schneemeyer =

Lynn F. Schneemeyer (born c. 1952) is a former professor of Chemistry and Biochemistry, and former Associate Dean for Academic Affairs, College of Science and Mathematics at Montclair State University. Prior to that, Dr. Schneemeyer served as Vice Provost for Research and Graduate Education at Rutgers-Newark, and as National Science Foundation Program Officer for the Chemistry Division from 2002 to 2005. Dr. Schneemeyer's publications have appeared in numerous academic journals, including Solid State Sciences, Journal of Solid State Chemistry, Journal of Materials Research, and Nature. Awards include being named the 2003-2004 Sylvia M. Stoesser Lecturer in Chemistry.

== Research ==
Lynn Schneemeyer's research interests cover a broad range of materials including electronic, optical, superconducting, chemical, and magnetic materials. The focus of Dr. Schneemeyer's research has been on the design, synthesis and characterization of new materials with unique characteristics and applications potential.

== Education ==
- College of Notre Dame of Maryland, B.A., 1973
- Cornell University, M.S., 1976
- Cornell University, Ph.D., 1978
- Massachusetts Institute of Technology, 1978–1980
