= Jean Maria Arrigo =

American social psychologist (1944–2024)

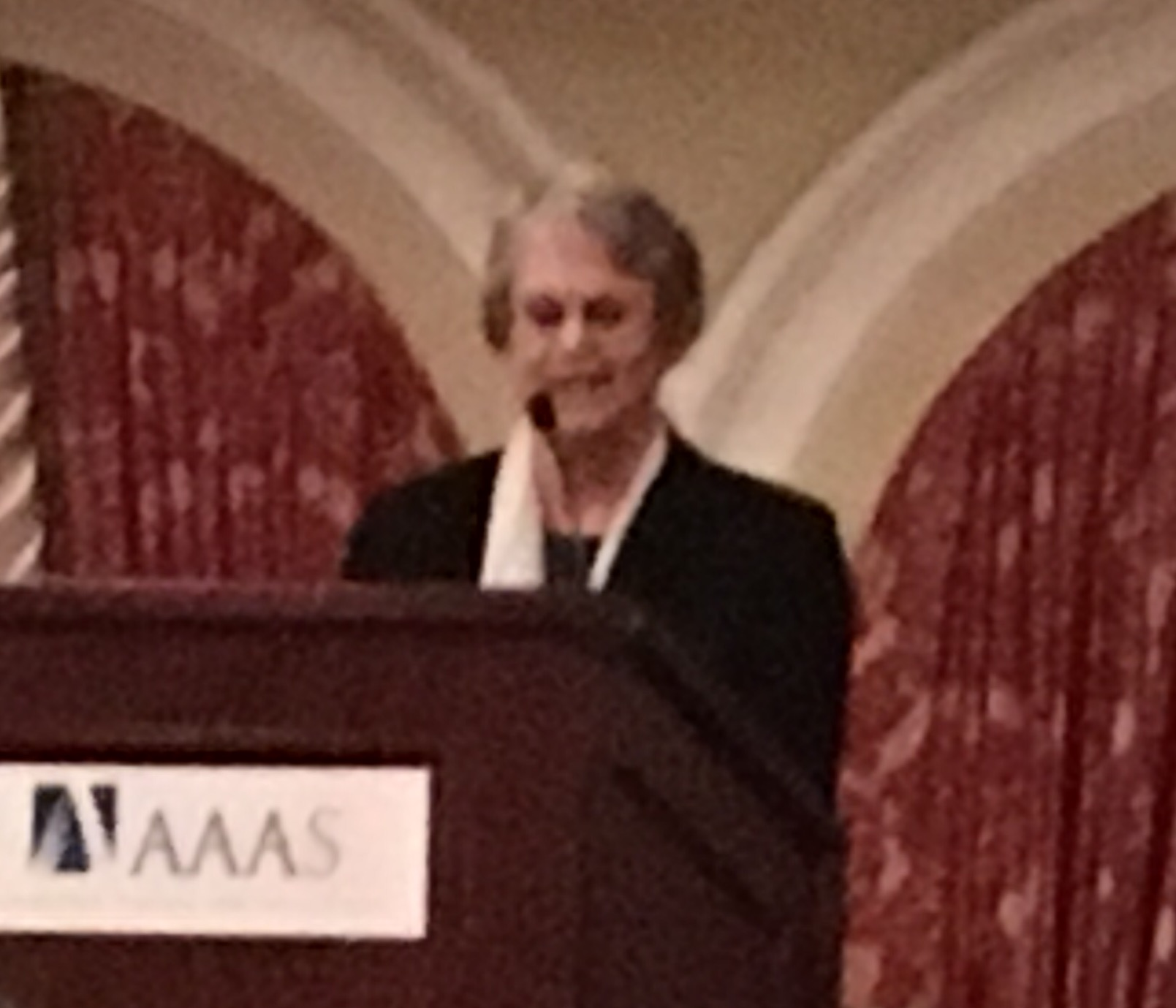
- Born: April 30, 1944; Memphis, Tennessee, U.S.
- Died: February 24, 2024 (aged 79); Alpine, California, U.S.
- Awards: AAAS Award for Scientific Freedom and Responsibility
- Scientific career
- Fields: social psychologist

Jean Maria Arrigo (April 30, 1944 – February 24, 2024) was an American social psychologist and oral historian.

== Career ==
Arrigo was born in Memphis, Tennessee in 1944. She earned bachelor's and master's degrees in mathematics in 1966 and 1969 respectively from the University of California and was an adjunct professor in that field at San Diego State University for 11 years. Arrigo then earned a master's degree (1995), and PhD (1999) from Claremont Graduate University in social psychology.

Arrigo was a member of a 2005 American Psychological Association (APA) task force evaluating the role of psychologists in U.S. intelligence and military interrogations of detainees. She became known for exposing conflicts of interest of most of the others on the nominally independent task force, who were allied in advance with advocates of harsh interrogation methods.

For her whistleblowing actions, the APA honored Arrigo in 2015, and the American Association for the Advancement of Science presented their 2015 AAAS Award for Scientific Freedom and Responsibility to her.

On February 24, 2024, Arrigo died of pancreatic cancer in Alpine, California, at the age of 79.

== Published works ==
- "Torture Is for Amateurs'". International Society for Military Ethics. 2006.
- Sins and Salvations in Clandestine Scientific Research: A Social Psychological and Epistemological Inquiry, Claremont Graduate University, 1999
- Jean Maria Arrigo; Richard V. Wagner (16 July 2014). "Military Ethics and Peace Psychology: A Dialogue". Peace and Conflict. Psychology Press: 2. ISBN 978-1-317-75920-1.
