= Sylvia M. Stoesser Lecturer in Chemistry =

Sylvia M. Stoesser Lecture
- Sponsored by: Yulan Tong and Dow AgroSciences
- Date: 2000
- Country: United States of America
- Presented by: University of Illinois

The Sylvia M. Stoesser Lecture series was established in 2000 by the Department of Chemistry at the University of Illinois. It is supported by alumna Yulan Tong and by Dow AgroSciences. It is named after the first woman chemist to work at Dow, Sylvia M. Stoesser. The lectureship is given every two years to "an individual who has made outstanding contributions to the chemical community and provides new perspectives in the chemical field outside academia."

== Lecturers ==
- 2021-2022, Regina Easley, National Institute of Standards and Technology
- 2019-2020, Esther Tristani, Burt's Bees
- 2017-2018, Linda McGill-Boasmond, Cedar Concepts Corporation
- 2016-2017, Gayle Schueller, 3M Company
- 2015-2016, Kathrin U. Jansen, Pfizer
- 2014-2015, Nancy B. Jackson, U.S. Department of State
- 2013-2014, Rina Dukor, BioTools, Inc.
- 2012-2013, Ann E. Weber, Merck Research Laboratories
- 2011-2012, Catherine T. Hunt, Dow Chemical
- 2010-2011, Victoria Haynes, RTI International
- 2009-2010, Jennifer Holmgren, UOP, LLC
- 2008-2009, Ellen B. Stechel, Sandia National Laboratories
- 2007-2008, Sarah E. Kelly, Pfizer
- 2006-2007, Madeleine Jacobs, American Chemical Society
- 2005-2006, Marquita Qualls, GlaxoSmithKline
- 2003-2004, Lynn Schneemeyer, National Science Foundation
- 2002-2003, Joan Berkowitz, Farkas, Berkowitz & Company
- 2001-2002, Valerie J. Kuck, Bell Laboratories, Lucent Technologies
- 2000, Roberta L. Dorow, Pharmacia & Upjohn
