= Nancy B. Jackson =

American chemist (1956–2022)

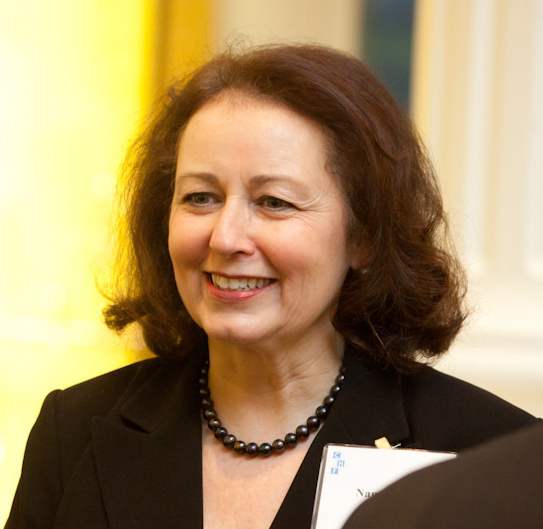
- Jackson in 2011
- Born: March 1, 1956; Eau Claire, Wisconsin
- Died: January 3, 2022 (aged 65); Albuquerque, New Mexico
- Education: George Washington University, University of Texas at Austin
- Awards: AAAS Award for Science Diplomacy, (2012)
- Scientific career
- Fields: Alternative fuels, safety
- Workplaces: Sandia National Laboratories
- Thesis: CO hydrogenation over zirconia-based metal oxides (1990)
- Doctoral advisor: John G. Ekerdt

External videos
- Nancy Jackson, Mentors made the difference, American Chemical Society

Nancy Beth Jackson (March 1, 1956 – January 3, 2022) was an American chemist. She did energy research on heterogeneous catalysis and the development of alternative fuels. She also worked in the field of chemical nonproliferation, educating chemical professionals on the importance of safe and secure chemical practice in research, teaching and business, in an effort to prevent the misuse of chemicals as "weapons, poisons, explosives or environmental pollutants". She was the first implementer in developing the international Chemical Security Engagement Program. She was active in promoting diversity in STEM fields. She was president of the American Chemical Society in 2011, leading the organization during the International Year of Chemistry. In 2012, she was honored with the AAAS Award for Science Diplomacy.

== Early life and education ==
Jackson was born March 1, 1956, in Eau Claire, Wisconsin, to a Seneca father and a white mother. Both of her parents were ministers, and both of her grandmothers held master's degrees. One of her grandfathers came from the Cattaraugus Reservation in upstate New York.

Jackson initially studied political science at university, but became increasingly interested in science. She received a B.S. in chemistry from George Washington University in 1979. After working briefly in the education department of the American Chemical Society she decided to return to school at the University of Texas at Austin. She received an M.S. in chemical engineering in 1986 and a Ph.D. in chemical engineering in 1990, working in the area of catalysis.

== Career ==
Jackson joined the Catalysis and Chemical Technologies department of the Energy and Environment sector at Sandia National Laboratories in Albuquerque, New Mexico, in 1991. There she worked as an energy researcher for many years, focusing on alternative energy sources such as solar fuel. She has studied heterogeneous catalysis with an emphasis on identifying catalysts that can enable production of liquid fuels from non-petroleum sources. In addition, she became an associate research professor in the Department of Chemical and Nuclear Engineering of the University of New Mexico in 1999.

Jackson was manager of the Chemical and Biological Imaging, Sensing and Analysis Department at Sandia from 2000–2004. Her work involved chemical imaging techniques including fluorescent and infrared imaging, point infrared spectroscopy, and analysis of hyperspectral images and materials. Applications included imaging of DNA microarrays, analysis of polymeric materials, and examination of the structure-property relationships of heterogeneous catalytic materials.

She was deputy director of the International Security Center at Sandia from 2004–2006. In 2007, she became founder and manager of the International Chemical Threat Reduction Department in the Global Security Center at Sandia. Jackson was the first implementer to work with the U.S. Department of State to develop the Chemical Security Engagement Program, an international program to raise awareness about chemical safety and security among chemical professionals throughout Southeast Asia, South Asia, the Middle East, and North Africa. As part of her work she has traveled extensively in these areas.

Jackson was active in encouraging diversity in STEM. She was Seneca, and was a member of the American Indian Science and Engineering Society. She has served as a tribal government liaison for Sandia, and worked with tribal colleges in developing the Science and Technology Alliance, a STEM program for underrepresented minorities. She is also an active advocate for women in STEM fields.

Jackson was a Fellow of the American Chemical Society, the International Union of Pure and Applied Chemistry, and the American Association for the Advancement of Science. She was elected in 2009 to the presidential succession of the American Chemical Society, serving as president-elect in 2010, president during the United Nations' International Year of Chemistry in 2011, and immediate past president in 2012. During the three-year period following her election, she focused on expanding international collaboration, visiting more than 20 countries on five continents to meet with chemists and chemical engineers, many of them women.

In 2012, she received the AAAS Award for Science Diplomacy "for her ongoing commitment to international science cooperation to prevent the theft and diversion of chemicals through the establishment of the Chemical Security Engagement Program and for developing, nurturing, and advancing careers of scientists worldwide, with a special emphasis on women scientists in the Middle East and Southeast Asia."

In 2014, she became the 174th Franklin Fellow at the U.S. Department of State.

== Personal life and death ==
She died in Albuquerque, New Mexico, on January 3, 2022, at the age of 65. She was survived by her husband and their two sons.

== Awards and honors ==
- 2014–15 Sylvia M. Stoesser Lecturer in Chemistry at the University of Illinois
- 2012, AAAS Award for Science Diplomacy.
- 2011, President of the American Chemical Society
- 2011, Distinguished Women in Chemistry and Chemical Engineering Award, International Union of Pure and Applied Chemistry
- 2009, Howard Fawcett Chemical Health & Safety Award
- 2005, American Indian Science and Engineering Society (AISES) Professional of the Year award.
- 2005, Distinguished Alumni Achievement Award, George Washington University
