= International Community of Iranian Academics =

Independent network of Persian scholars

The International Community of Iranian Academics (ICOIA) is an independent and network of Persian scholars. Founded in October 2022, ICOIA is run by diaspora academics who now live abroad, mainly in North America, Europe and Australia. Made up of approximately 100 members, ICOIA sees its mission to improve access to information about academics and students in Iran and raising awareness of issues facing the global Iranian academic community.

Following the death of Mahsa Amini, who was accused of wearing her hijab “inappropriately", university students have protested state brutality by staging sit-ins, class boycotts and slogans. The Iranian government has responded forcefully to student protests and many have been suspended from university, arrested, detained tortured and killed.

ICOIA has demanded that the Iranian government recognize the right to freedom of expression and association.

== History ==
Since 1979, the Islamic Republic of Iran has interfered with knowledge production. The Iranian academic community have been at the forefront of resistance, with professors and researchers supporting antigovernment protests. Protests, led by women students and academics at Iranian universities in 2022, led to another government crackdowns, affecting scholars, researchers and students alike, across the region. ICOIA was established by founding mempber,such as Encieh Erfani, to support Persian language scholars and researchers in Canada and globally.
