= National Animal Interest Alliance =

Non-profit organization

- Founded: 1991
- Founder: Patti Strand
- Type: 501(c)(3)
- Location: Portland, Oregon
- Website: NAIAOnline.org

The National Animal Interest Alliance (NAIA) is a non-profit organization in the United States dedicated to promoting animal welfare and animal husbandry practices, strengthening the human-animal bond, and safeguarding the rights of responsible animal owners and professionals through research, public education and public policy. The NAIA mission is "to promote the welfare of animals."

The organization's focus is clarifying the difference between animal welfare, the promotion of responsible and humane animal use and human-animal interaction and companionship, and animal rights; the ideology that seeks to end most human uses of animals.

== History ==
NAIA was founded in 1991 in Portland, Oregon by Adrian Morrison, a professor at the University of Pennsylvania, and Patti Strand, a dog owner and breeder of Dalmatians. Since the founding of NAIA, it has created partnerships with individuals and groups promoting animal welfare and animal husbandry, such as the American Kennel Club, Canine Companions for Independence, Professional Rodeo Cowboys Association, and others.

== Positions ==
NAIA supports the responsible and humane use of animals for food, clothing, medical research, companionship, assistance, recreation, entertainment and education. It believes that the relationships between humans and animals, on many levels, is important to both.

=== Pets ===
NAIA has taken a moderate approach to new measures for the protection of animals. In many cases, it believes that existing legislation is sufficient and that more effort needs to go into enforcement. In 2001, the NAIA opposed the Puppy Protection Act (S. 1478 and H.R. 3058) on the grounds that its definitions were too broad, classifying family breeders on the same lines as large commercial operations. NAIA noted that the measure would be used to regulate every person who sells even one litter of puppies.

Some animal rights organizations support legislation to establish or increase civil damages for the harm or loss of pets or companion animals. In 2007, Mark Cushing, a legal adviser for NAIA, argued on their behalf that damages for loss of or harm to pets should remain unchanged. This position is also endorsed by the major veterinary organizations.

For years, NAIA has collected data from shelters across the country to document the status of pet and companion animal populations. The Humane Society and PETA have raised funds and argued for certain legislation based on an alleged problem of pet overpopulation. NAIA has not documented overpopulation; shelters report they have fewer animals. The Salem News of Oregon reports that shelter euthanasia rates have decreased markedly in most parts of the country, as shelters market their pets better, and demand for puppies and dogs is high.

According to the United States Centers for Disease Control, "300,000 dogs are brought into the US annually," and street dogs are being smuggled in from other countries for "adoption". The National Association of State Public Health Veterinarians recommended: "The movement of dogs for purpose of adoption or sale from areas with dog-to-dog rabies transmission should be prohibited." Such importing puts Americans, their dogs and other animals at risk from disease. For this reason, NAIA supported efforts in the 2008 Farm Bill to add protections regulating the importation of dogs and other pets.

The Humane Society of the United States reports that about 4 million cats and dogs are euthanized yearly in shelters in the US. But, the NAIA says that the Humane Society does not differentiate in its reporting on euthanasia between the number of adoptable animals and others. For instance, shelters generally consider feral cats as unadoptable, as are a number of dogs that are too old, too sick or have behavior problems.

NAIA is opposed to mandatory pet spay/neuter legislation. According to NAIA, costs and euthanasia rates both increase after the introduction of this type of legislation. NAIA claims that "spay or pay" licensing schemes [have] little effect on reducing shelter intake and euthanasia rates, while producing serious unintended consequences.” The animal rights group PETA disputes this, saying that spay/neuter is the only way to eliminate pet overpopulation, and that mandatory spay/neuter legislation is a step towards this goal.

NAIA opposes laws restricting the practices of docking, ear cropping, bark softening of dogs, and removing the claws of cats. They believe such decisions are best left to animal owners and their veterinarians. NAIA states that docking, when done within the first few days, does not cause pain because the nervous system has not yet developed. The other procedures require appropriate veterinary care and pain management. Some jurisdictions have banned these three practices. An example of increasing concern about animal welfare has influenced local legislation; for instance, the Hastings Borough Council in the United Kingdom has passed an animal welfare charter.

NAIA has noted the unintended consequences of legislation prohibiting the commercial slaughter of horses in the United States. It has led to horses being neglected and abandoned to poor health by people who cannot afford to care for them. USA Today reported in 2010 that the Humane Society of Missouri "and other anti-slaughter advocates claim" that there has been no increase in the number of abandoned or unwanted horses since the federal ban on slaughter in 2005. But, the United States Government Accountability Office (GAO) in 2011 found that Colorado reported more investigations of abuse, and Texas, California and Florida reported more horses abandoned on private and public lands.

The GAO has documented that, since the federal legislation, many unwanted horses are now being transported on long rides from the United States to Canada and to Mexico, where they are slaughtered in a manner far less humane than that used in the US. The meat is shipped to markets in Europe and Japan. GAO reported: "From 2006 through 2010, U.S. horse exports for slaughter increased by 148 and 660 percent to Canada and Mexico, respectively. As a result, nearly the same number of U.S. horses was transported to Canada and Mexico for slaughter in 2010--nearly 138,000-as was slaughtered before domestic slaughter ceased."

The American Kennel Club lists NAIA as an allied group; in Oregon, it is provided as the state AKC contact for Oregon concerning legislation related to dog fanciers. The AKC says that the NAIA is “interested in protecting and promoting the world of purebred dogs”. Patti Strand, one of the NAIA founders and a longtime dog breeder, is a member of the board of directors of the AKC.

=== Industrialized farming ===
The NAIA lobbied against California Proposition 2, passed in November 2008, which was strongly promoted by the Humane Society of the United States. It believed that elements of the proposition were too restrictive and would adversely affect the availability of food for human consumption.

=== Animal Enterprise Terrorism Act ===
NAIA lobbied for passage of the Animal Enterprise Terrorism Act (AETA). It allows for special consideration of terrorism issues in the sentencing of animal rights activists. NAIA testified that radical environmental and animal rights groups increasingly dominate the mainstream animal welfare movement. NAIA said such groups have used “violence, intimidation, arson, theft, and other crimes against biomedical researchers, furriers, hunters, trappers, dog and cat breeders, livestock farmers, zoos, circuses, rodeos, exotic animal breeders, and related enterprises.” Such actions of radical animal rights activists have often been reported by the news media.

In 2007, in an article on domestic terrorism, the Southern Poverty Law Center (SPLC) discussed a draft report of the US Department of Homeland Security (DHS), published by the Congressional Quarterly, in which the DHS listed radical animal rights and environmental groups, such as the Animal Liberation Front, as "the only serious domestic terrorist threats." Its writers noted that such groups had done extensive property damage, but in the US they had not killed anyone. The SPLC article continues: "something that most definitely cannot be said of the white supremacists and others who people the American radical right.", which the DHS did not include.

The ACLU opposed the AETA, on the grounds that the proposed law "criminalize(d) First Amendment activities such as demonstrations, leafleting, undercover investigations, and boycotts."

== Challenges to non-profit groups ==
Since 2001, NAIA has challenged the non-profit status of certain animal rights groups, notably People for the Ethical Treatment of Animals (PETA), saying that it and similar groups “use intimidation, harassment and deception to raise money” and use those funds for purposes other than those identified in their campaigns.

It has documented that the Humane Society of the United States does not operate any animal shelters or provide direct care to animals. HSUS spends a great proportion of its revenues on lobbying and working to write and pass legislation.

== NAIA Shelter Project ==
In order to understand pet population trends, improve the health and welfare of animals and reduce euthanasia of adoptable pets in shelters the NAIA created the NAIA Shelter Project. This project has helped countless organizations, educational programs and research groups over the years to inform, educate and provide comprehensive information about individual animal shelters.

They have compiled a large database of statistics that can be visualized graphically of most of the animal shelters in the United States reporting information by year such as:

- Animal Population
- Animal Euthanizations
- Animals Received
- Animals Returned
- Animals Transferred

== Discover Animals ==
In 2016 in conjunction with other animal experts the NAIA created Discover Animals, a program and free online resources which promotes responsible pet care, ownership and also serves as a compendium of factual animal information and multimedia for animal lovers and enthusiasts.

== Funding ==
NAIA receives its primary financial support from donations from individuals, the majority of whom are pet owners who support the goals of NAIA. In addition, it receives some funds from related businesses and associations in farm animal agribusiness; commercial breeding, hunting, fishing, trapping, fur ranching, animal research, rodeos and circuses. It has created alliances to work for the responsible treatment of animals while preserving opportunities for companionship with humans, animal husbandry, conservation of habitat for wild animals and birds, and animal research.
