= AAAS David and Betty Hamburg Award for Science Diplomacy =

Award by the American Association for the Advancement of Science

David and Betty Hamburg Award for Science Diplomacy
- Date: 1992
- Country: United States of America
- Presented by: AAAS
- Formerly called: AAAS Award for Science Diplomacy (2010-2021); Award for International Scientific Cooperation (1992-2009)

The AAAS David and Betty Hamburg Award for Science Diplomacy (2022–), formerly the AAAS Award for Science Diplomacy (2010–2021) and Award for International Scientific Cooperation (1992–2009), is awarded by the American Association for the Advancement of Science (AAAS). After the 2021 presentation, the award was renamed in honor of psychiatrists David A. Hamburg and Beatrix Hamburg.

With this award, in collaboration with its affiliated organizations, AAAS seeks to recognize an individual or a limited number of individuals working together in the international scientific or engineering community for making an outstanding contribution to furthering international cooperation in science and engineering. The award offers a monetary prize of $2,500, a certificate of citation, and travel expenses to attend the AAAS annual meeting to receive the award.

== Recipients ==
Year	Recipient	Country	Field	References
2022	Sir David A. King	Great Britain	physical chemist	
2021	Carlos Nobre	Brazil	meteorologist	
2020	Exequiel Ezcurra	Mexico	plant ecologist, conservationist	
2019	Christopher Llewellyn Smith, Eliezer Rabinovici, Zehra Sayers, Herwig Schopper and Khaled Toukan	Jordan	physicist	
2018	Lassina Zerbo	Burkina Faso	geophysicist	
2016	Grace Naledi Mandisa Pandor	South Africa	education	
2015	Peter Gluckman	New Zealand	perinatal biology	
2014	Zafra Lerman	Middle East, Malta	chemist, human rights	
2013	Siegfried Hecker	USA	metallurgist, nuclear scientist	
2012	Nancy B. Jackson	USA	chemist	
2011	No award given			
2010	Glenn E. Schweitzer	USA	science diplomacy	
2009	Katepalli R. Sreenivasan	India, USA	Aerospace engineering	
2008	Thomas Pickering	USA	diplomat	
2007	Robert T. Watson	Great Britain	chemist	
2006	Jianguo Wu	China, USA	ecologist	
2005	Kyle T. Alfriend, Paul J. Cefola, Felix R. Hoots, P. Kenneth Seidelmann, Andrey I. Nazarenko, Vasiliy S. Yurasov, Stanislav S. Veniaminov	USA, Russia	space domain awareness	
2004	Michael Jeffrey Balick	USA	ethnobotanist	
2003	Mahabir P. Gupta	India, Latin America	biodiversity, plants	
2002	L. S. Fletcher	USA	aerospace engineering	
2001	Guenther Bauer	Austria	physics	
2000	Kenneth Bridbord	USA	global public health	
1999	Gunter E. Weller		arctic research	
1998	Julia Marton-Lefevre	France, USA	science education	
1997	Bert Rickard Johannes Bolin	Sweden	meteorologist	
1996	Philip Hemily	USA	engineering	
1995	Joseph H. Hamilton	USA	nuclear physics	
1994	Harold K. Jacobson	USA	political science	
1993	Thomas Malone	USA	organizational studies	
1992	Robert E. Marshak	USA	physicist	

== See also ==
- AAAS Award for Scientific Freedom and Responsibility
- AAAS Philip Hauge Abelson Prize
- AAAS Prize for Behavioral Science Research
- Newcomb Cleveland Prize
