= Catherine T. Hunt =

American chemist (born 1955)

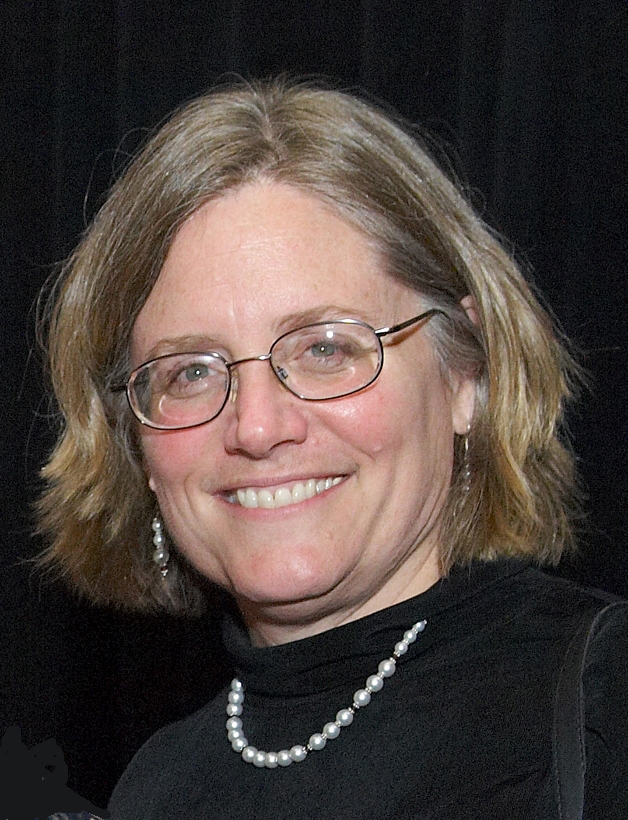
- Hunt in 2006
- Born: June 29, 1955 (age 70); Bronxville, New York, USA
- Education: Smith College, Cum Laude, 1977; University of California, Davis, 1981; NIH Postdoctoral Fellow, Yale University, 1982-1984
- Known for: 2007 President of the American Chemical Society
- Scientific career
- Fields: Chemistry
- Institutions: Rohm and Haas; Dow Chemical Company

Catherine T. Hunt (born June 29, 1955) is an American chemist. In 2007, she served as the president of the American Chemical Society (ACS). She was a director at Dow Chemical Company.

== Early life and education ==
One of seven siblings, Hunt was born in Bronxville, New York, in 1955. She received her bachelor's degree in chemistry in 1977 from Smith College and her Ph.D. in chemistry in 1981 from University of California, Davis, where she worked on nuclear magnetic resonance supervised by Alan Balch. She then moved to a postdoctoral fellowship with Ian Armitage, Robert Shulman, and James Prestegard at Yale University from 1982 to 1984.

== Career ==
After her postdoctoral fellowship, Hunt became a senior scientist at Rohm and Haas in 1984 and subsequently held a variety of management positions within the company. When Rohm and Haas was bought by Dow Chemical Company in 2009, she transitioned into a research and development director role there, and has since retired.

In 2007, Hunt served as president of the American Chemical Society, having been elected in 2006 in the first ACS election for which internet voting was available. She has expressed her belief that the U.S. should "reignite its commitment to science" both in her inaugural speech and her petition to President George W. Bush prior to her presidency. She ran on a platform of broader public outreach and interest in science education. She also served on the board of directors from 2006 to 2008 and is part of the Women Chemists Committee of Philadelphia ACS.

== Awards and memberships ==
Hunt became a fellow of the American Association for the Advancement of Science in 2007.

Hunt was named one of the “Best 50 Women in Business” in Pennsylvania by Governor Rendell in 2007.

She received the Smith College Medal in 2008 and the Outstanding Alumna of the Year Award from UC Davis in 2008.

She was an inaugural fellow of the American Chemical Society in 2009.

Hunt was also the 2011–12 Sylvia M. Stoesser Lecturer in Chemistry at the University of Illinois at Urbana–Champaign.

She held the Brent Halsey Distinguished Visiting Professorship in 2017.

== Personal life ==
Hunt is married and the couple have one son, born in 1991. They live in Upper Dublin together. She is an avid cyclist. She has also joined the board of the Academy of Natural Sciences of Drexel University. Hunt has encouraged and mentored many women who were seeking a STEM education. As one of the role model scientist for many women, she was one of the 25 women who represented the U.S. in the People to People Ambassador Program's Women in Science Delegation to Cuba, where she presented a paper entitled Virtuous, not just Virtual, Teams: Analytical Networks Deliver. During her free time, she enjoys mentoring, judging science fairs and serving on the Upper Dublin Library Board.
