= Discover Animals =

Discover Animals is an online animal resource created by the National Animal Interest Alliance in 2016. This program was created to help provide accurate, useful and reliable information about animals in wild and domestic setting and responsible pet ownership.

== Animal Kingdom ==
Through this program, Discover Animals provides an ever-expanding guide to the world's animals for people seeking scientific information as well as personal appreciation and enjoyment. It uses multimedia and refers to numerous and diverse animal-related resources.

== Pet Guide ==
A primary objective of Discover Animals is to provide useful and supportive information to pet enthusiasts about animal care, training, behavior and responsible pet ownership practices, with guides for dogs, cats, birds, aquatics, herps and small animals. The pet guides feature a full list of dog and cat breeds with additional information about breed-specific traits.

== Conservation, Science and more ==
Discover Animals features a wide range of articles about working animals, animal research, pets and animal training all written by animal experts such as highly experienced researchers, trainers, conservationists and scientists. Their articles are based on scientific studies and analysis which address sensitive animal topics such as invasive species, animal extinctions and animals in agriculture.
