= Joan Berkowitz =

American chemist (1931–2020)

Joan B. Berkowitz
- Born: March 13, 1931; Brooklyn, New York, U.S.
- Died: January 22, 2020 (aged 88)
- Education: Swarthmore College, University of Illinois Urbana-Champaign
- Scientific career
- Fields: Materials science
- Workplaces: Yale University, Massachusetts Institute of Technology, Arthur D. Little, Risk Science International, Farkas Berkowitz & Company

Joan B. Berkowitz (March 13, 1931 – January 22, 2020) was an American chemist. Her areas of research included materials for the space program, reusable molds for spacecraft construction built from molybdenum disilicides and tungsten disilicides, and the disposal and treatment of hazardous wastes. She was the first woman to serve as president of The Electrochemical Society.

== Biography ==
Born in Brooklyn, New York on March 13, 1931, Berkowitz attended PS 42, John Marshall Junior High School, and Midwood High School. She created a science project analyzing weather maps from the New York Times to study the movement of weather patterns. She earned a scholarship to Swarthmore College and graduated Phi Beta Kappa with a BA in 1952. At Swarthmore she published her first paper, "The Preparation of trans 4-chlorocyclohexanol".

Berkowitz wished to follow her high school boyfriend and fellow Swarthmore graduate Arthur Mattuck to Princeton University, but at the time Princeton did not accept women for graduate school in chemistry. Instead she attended the University of Illinois Urbana-Champaign, graduating with a PhD in physical chemistry in 1955. Her dissertation was "Studies on Electrolytes", which focused on the application of the Poisson–Boltzmann equation to polymeric electrolytes. She used ILLIAC I, an early computer, for the numerical solutions.

From 1955 to 1957 she was a National Science Foundation postdoctoral fellow at Yale University studying polymeric electrolytes. In 1959, she married Arthur Mattuck, who at that point had become a professor of mathematics at the Massachusetts Institute of Technology. They divorced in 1977.

In 1959 she joined the consulting firm of Arthur D. Little, where she would spend over two decades. Her early work at the firm concerned high-temperature oxidation and materials for the space program, focusing on the transition metals molybdenum, tungsten, and zirconium. She developed reusable molds from molybdenum disilicides and tungsten disilicides that were used in spacecraft construction.

In the 1970s her work concerned environmental matters. She headed a team which created the two volume Physical, Chemical and Biological Treatment Techniques for Industrial Wastes (1976), a survey of manufactured goods and their potential for causing pollution. She examined limestone scrubbers that removed sulfur dioxide, demonstrated how to reduce hard deposits which hindered their effectiveness, and improved their design. She also studied the disposal of hazardous wastes in landfills and produced the first handbook on alternative disposal methods. In 1979 she became the first female president of The Electrochemical Society. By the 1980s she was a vice president and later head of the Environmental Business World Wide section at A.D. Little.

In 1986 she left A.D. Little to become CEO of Risk Science International. In 1989 she co-founded with Allen Farkas the consulting firm Farkas Berkowitz & Company. In addition she has taught as an adjunct professor at the University of Maryland University College.

== Personal life ==
In 1959, Berkowitz married Arthur Mattuck, a high school classmate who was by that time a mathematics professor at the Massachusetts Institute of Technology. Mattuck and Berkowitz divorced in 1977. They had one daughter, Rosemary, who is also a chemist.

Berkowitz died on January 22, 2020, at the age of 88.

== Awards and honors ==
- 2005, Stanley J. Drazek award for excellence in teaching, University of Maryland University College (UMUC) Graduate School of Management and Technology
- 2002-2003, Sylvia M. Stoesser Lecturer in Chemistry
- 1983, Achievement Award, Society of Women Engineers
