= Sylvia Stoesser =

American chemist

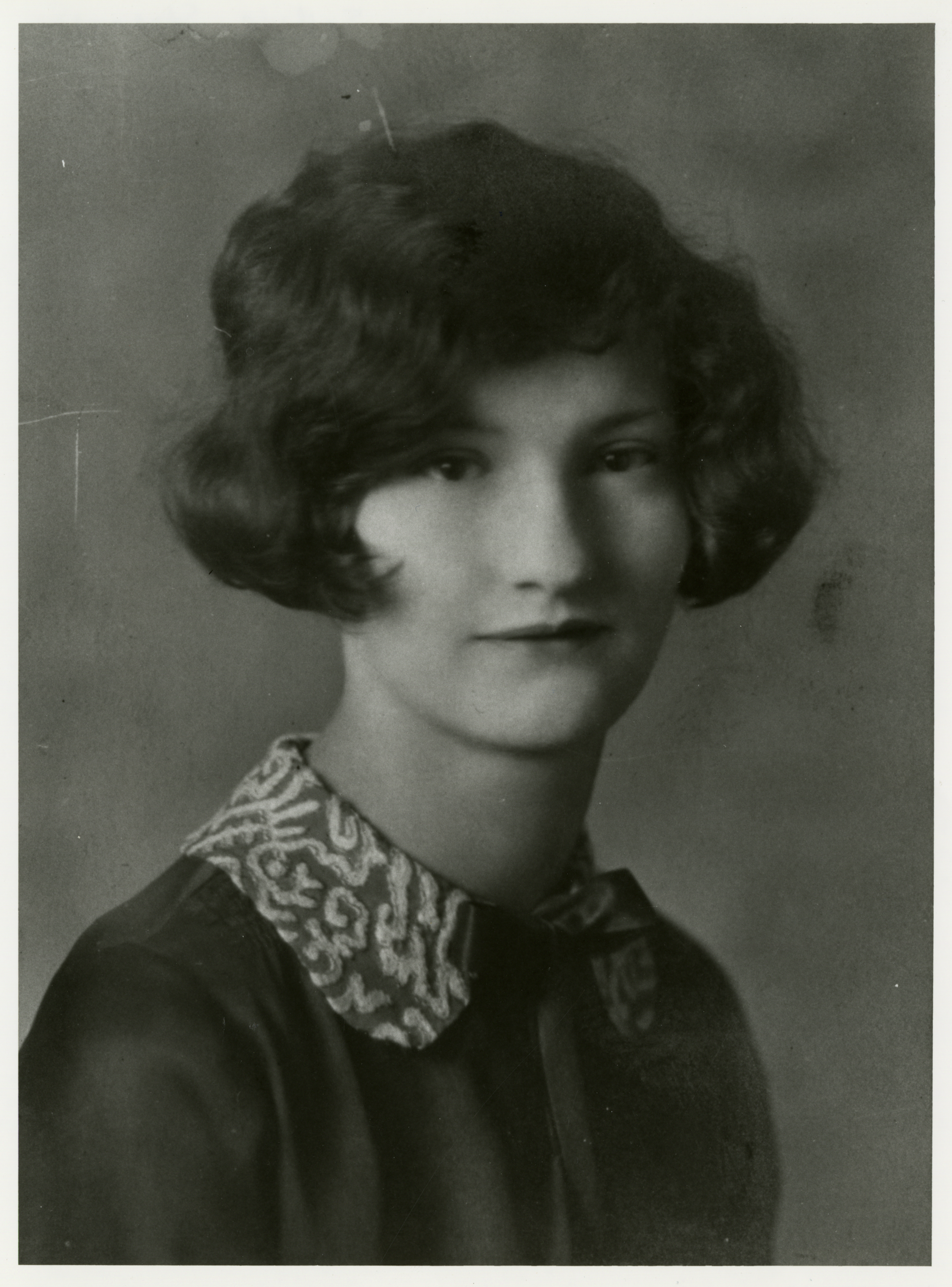
- Stoesser in 1929
- Born: Sylvia Marie Goergen; July 18, 1901; Buffalo, New York, US
- Died: March 17, 1991 (aged 89); Midland, Michigan, US
- Education: University of Buffalo, State University of Iowa
- Spouse: Wesley Carl Stoesser (1901–1989)
- Scientific career
- Fields: Physical chemistry
- Workplaces: Dow Chemical Company

Sylvia Marie Stoesser (née Goergen, July 18, 1901 – March 17, 1991), was an American chemist. She was the first woman to be employed as a chemist at Dow Chemical Company. During her time at Dow, she made a number of major contributions, holding more than two dozen patents as a result of her research.

Stoesser developed a dry cleaning fluid that used perchloroethylene and was safer than the naphtha-based solvents then in use. She was the first to explore the use of organic acid inhibitors to stimulate production in oil wells. Organic inhibitors were much more effective than inorganics, and became the basis for a profitable subsidiary, Dowell Incorporated. Stoesser improved the quality of ethylene, ethylbenzene, and styrene to create stable polymers including polystyrene and styrofoam. Her work on styrene led to major improvements in early plastics production and to the creation of synthetic substitutes for rubber during World War II. In 1952, she co-edited the first comprehensive work on Styrene, Its Polymers, Copolymers, and Derivatives.

== Early life and education ==
Sylvia Marie Goergen was born on July 18, 1901, to Teresa M. and George J. Goergen of Buffalo, New York. She attended the University of Buffalo, where she received her B.S. magna cum laude in chemistry in 1923. She then attended the State University of Iowa, completing her master's thesis, The potential of the silver in silver iodide electrode in 1925 and earning her Ph.D. in physical chemistry with the thesis The adsorption and catalytic properties of stannous acid in 1928. Her advisor was James Newton Pearce (1873–1936). On August 16, 1929, in Rock Creek, Maryland, she married Wesley Carl Stoesser (July 6, 1901 – March 22, 1989), a fellow chemist who had also graduated from the University of Buffalo and the University of Iowa.

== Career ==
Prior to her marriage, she was hired to study sugar at the National Bureau of Standards. She and Richard F. Jackson were given the task of finding a sweetener suitable for people with diabetes. They were the first to prepare Difructose anhydride I.

In July 1928, Wesley Stoesser was hired to work in the Organic Lab at the Dow Chemical Company. In 1929, Stoesser was hired as well. She was the first woman to become a scientist at Dow, and was hired directly by Herbert Henry Dow, rather than going through the usual interview and hiring process.

According to one account, Wesley confided to Grace A. Dow that Sylvia would only marry and move if she had a job in her field, and Grace interceded with her husband Henry. According to the Stoessers' daughter, Judith Jaastad (later Siembieda), only the two couples knew that the new hire was a woman before she walked into the Physical Research Laboratory to start work. Stories also suggest that she was assigned to Dow's Physical Research Laboratory because at that time, it was near a library, the only building with washroom facilities for women.

At the time of her hiring in 1929, she was the only person with a Ph.D. in Dow's Physical Research Laboratory. Contemporaries emphasize that she was willing to help anyone who asked, making her expertise available both within and across departments.

She was the first female chemist in Dow Research anywhere, and certainly the first Ph.D. In our lab, she was the scientist of the group. Everybody went to her to try out their ideas and get help. – Ray Boundy

She was referred to as the "nasal chemist" because she could identify many of the ingredients in an unknown laboratory mixture by smelling it.

After her daughter's birth in 1940, Stoesser was no longer employed on the Dow staff as a research chemist. However, she continued to consult for Dow.

== Research ==
While working for Dow, Stoesser registered at least twenty-six patents. She helped to develop products including dry cleaning solvents, saran, polystyrene, styrofoam, high-pressure lubricants, and organic inhibitors for use in oil wells. One patent was held solely in her name. The rest list fifteen different co-owners, reflecting her extensive involvement in projects at Dow. One patent includes her husband as a co-owner.

=== Acid inhibitors ===
Five of Stoesser's patents involved the use of acid inhibitors to increase crude oil production in oil wells, a type of well stimulation. The flow of oil wells had been stimulated by the addition of acids as early as 1865, but acids tended to damage well casings and other equipment. Approached in 1932, John Grebe of Dow insisted that any acid used to improve oil well production must include an inhibitor to mitigate corrosion.

One of several scientists tasked with developing effective inhibitors, Stoesser is credited as the "key inventor" of second-state inhibitors, achieving "the second great milestone in the history of acidizing" due to her work in 1932–1933. Her work was "particularly important" because she shifted focus from inorganic to organic compounds, seeking something that would produce a protective film on metallic surfaces. The organic inhibitors (including mercaptans) that she discovered were much more effective than the inorganics previously tried (arsenic acid and copper salts).

Burgeoning demand for oil well treatment led to the creation of the Dow Well Service, which became the subsidiary Dowell Incorporated in November 1932. Stoesser's inhibitor research was essential to the creation and success of Dowell.

Another problem that affected wells was the buildup of substances that clogged the well and restricted production. Stoesser and L. C. Chamberlain developed an organic solvent mixture that could be used to remove built-up paraffin deposits. Marketed as Dowell Paraffin Solvent, it contained carbon tetrachloride, perchloroethylene, and petroleum naphtha. It was a very successful product for Dowell.

Stoesser and John Grebe may also have described the first known case of the technique that is now called hydraulic fracturing.

=== Cleaning solvents ===
Another of Stoesser's assignments was to study cleaning solvents such as naphtha. Naphtha posed a combustion risk, and attempts were being made to ban its use. Stoesser developed an alternative dry cleaning fluid using perchloroethylene that was non-flammable and non-explosive. She also developed inhibitors that helped to prevent metal corrosion in the dry-cleaning equipment.

=== Styrene, polystyrene, and styrofoam ===
Twelve of Stoesser's patents relate to the development of early plastics in the 1930s. Stoesser was responsible for significant improvements in plastics production. Dow wanted to find ways to use benzene. Benzene reacted with ethylene to form the liquid hydrocarbon ethylbenzene. Ethylbenzene could be hydrogenated to form the flammable liquid monomer styrene. Styrene could be used to make the hydrocarbon polymer polystyrene.

The Dow Physics Laboratory began working with styrene in 1931. Styrene was difficult to process. Reactions were highly sensitive to even small differences in temperature, and styrene was capable of reacting with itself and releasing additional heat. Even in very small amounts, some of the compounds that were produced during processing could contaminate the desired end products of the reactions. As a result, polymers made from styrene were not stable: they tended to craze and change color over time.

Stoesser took on the analytical work of testing the quality of the styrene and the polymers that were created. She also studied the effects of various inhibitors on the processes. After recommending the purchase and use of a special rotary Podbielnick still, and distilling the styrene six times, she was able to successfully produce small quantities of pure styrene for use as a standard. This demonstrated that it was possible to make a pure form which was stable.

Stoesser's work was essential in identifying points in the process where contamination or uncontrolled heating caused impurities. Impurities due to traces of a sulfur compound were eventually tracked back to production of the original ethylene, from which they were transferred to ethylbenzene and styrene.

Working with Jim Pierce, Stoesser developed an inhibitor to produce a polystyrene of extremely high quality. This was a key step towards a low-cost commercial process for polymerization of the polystyrene Styron and a related plastic called Styraloy. Styron was crystal-clear and could be colored.

Styrene was important in creating synthetic substitutes for rubber, which were of great strategic importance in World War II. It also had great commercial importance. Styron, a polystyrene, was the first of the modern plastics. It became Dow's number one product in both sales volume and earnings, during Dow's first century. In 1941, Dow company developed processes for extruding polystyrene to form foam polystyrene, also known as Styrofoam.

Stoesser contributed the brief reminiscence "A stimulating group" to the edited collection A History of the Dow Chemical Physics Lab : the freedom to be creative (1990). She describes the atmosphere created in her group, directed by John Grebe:

In our laboratory no idea was discarded as being too crazy to investigate. In fact, we were encouraged daily to consider the impossible goal. Along with that freedom of thought and encouragement to try the impossible came many failures at the laboratory stage – but there were also many new product and process successes. – Sylvia Stoesser

Stoesser co-edited Styrene, Its Polymers, Copolymers, and Derivatives (1952) with Ray H. Boundy and Raymond F. Boyer. Stoesser is credited by Boundy as having been the primary writer of the two-volume work.

== Volunteer work ==
Stoesser was the first woman to be elected to the Midland, Michigan, school board (1950–1958). She was a volunteer at the Midland hospital and at the King's Daughters Home for the Elderly.

== Recognition ==
Stoesser died in Midland, Michigan, on March 17, 1991.

On August 12, 1991, the Dow Chemical Company first aired a 30-second television commercial, "Inspiration", as part of its "Dow lets you do great things" campaign. The commercial highlighted Stoesser's achievements as the first woman scientist at Dow. The Dow newsletter, Dow Today quoted from the script: "Dr. Stoesser created a new career path for women, and for her company... the same company that leads the nation in patents granted to women over the last decade."

Stoesser was inducted into the Michigan Women's Hall of Fame as of October 22, 1992, as announced in the Midland Daily News of July 5, 1992.

As of 2000, with the support of alumna Yulan Tong and Dow AgroSciences, the department of chemistry at the University of Illinois established a lecture series for the Sylvia M. Stoesser Lecturer in Chemistry, which recognizes women from outside academia who have made outstanding contributions.

In 2017, at the opening of the Global Dow Center in Midland, Michigan, the Dow Chemical Company announced that its Employee Development Center would be renamed the Stoesser Center.
