= J. David Jentsch =

American neuroscientist

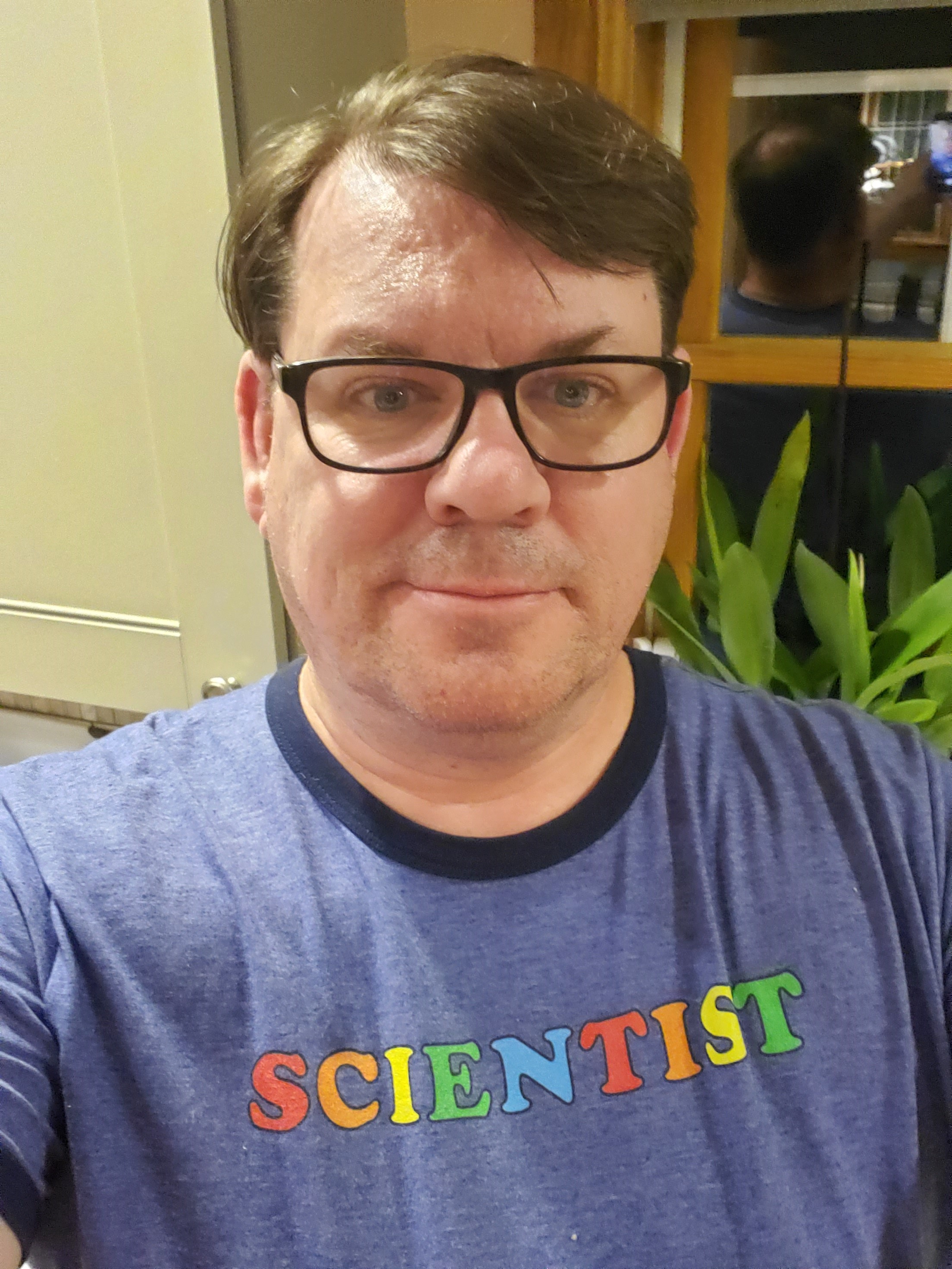
- Jentsch in 2020.
- Born: April 9, 1972 (age 54); Seguin, Texas, US
- Education: Johns Hopkins University; Yale University
- Awards: AAAS Award for Scientific Freedom and Responsibility
- Scientific career
- Workplaces: Binghamton University; University of California, Los Angeles
- Thesis: Neurochemical substrates of cognitive dysfunction produced by the psychotomimetic drug phencyclidine (1999)
- Doctoral advisor: Robert H. Roth
- Website: Jentsch Laboratory

James David Jentsch (born April 9, 1972) is an American neuroscientist. He is a SUNY Distinguished Professor and Chair of the Department of Psychology at Binghamton University. His research considers the neurobiological origins of psychoses and addiction. Jentsch was awarded the 2011 AAAS Award for Scientific Freedom and Responsibility.

== Early life and education ==
Jentsch was born on April 9, 1972, in Seguin, Texas. He studied behavioural biology at Johns Hopkins University. He moved to Yale University for his graduate studies, where he specialised in neurobiology. Here he worked on the biochemical changes associated with the abuse of psychotomimetic and stimulant drugs. He completed his doctoral research under the supervision of Robert Henry Roth. Jentsch was a postdoctoral scholar at the University of Pittsburgh, where he worked in the department of neuroscience.

== Research and career ==
Jentsch joined the University of California, Los Angeles in 2001. He was promoted to Associate Professor in 2007, and Associate Director of the Brain Research Institute and Professor in 2009. In 2009 Jentsch woke up to find that his car had been firebombed by animal rights activists. The firebombing was one of a series of attacks against UCLA researchers, criticising Jentsch's use of animals in his research on schizophrenia. The following summer Jentsch was on the receiving end of several violent threats from Camille Marino, who told Jentsch that the thought of his death amused her "immensely". Jentsch founded UCLA Pro-Test, a group that looked to take on the alleged misinformation shared by animal rights activists and tackle violent extremism.

Jentsch was made Empire Innovation Professor of Psychology at Binghamton University in 2015. His research looks to establish the neural and genetic mechanisms that underpin alcohol and drug addiction.

At Binghamton Jentsch was awarded a $11,700,000 grant from the National Institute on Drug Abuse to investigate cocaine addiction, and the neural pathways that can result in someone becoming addicted. Jentsch is interested in identifying the genes that can predispose people to drug addiction, as this may be able to inform life-saving interventions.

Jentsch serves on the advisory board of the Lifeboat Foundation.

== Awards and honours ==
- 2009 UCLA Department of Psychology Distinguished Teaching Award
- 2011 UCLA Department of Psychology Distinguished Service Award
- 2011 Society for Neuroscience Jacob P. Waletzky Memorial Award
- 2011 AAAS Award for Scientific Freedom and Responsibility
- 2014 Elected to the American College of Neuropsychopharmacology
- 2014 California Biomedical Research Association Leadership Award

== Selected publications ==
- Jentsch, J. David; Roth, Robert H (March 1, 1999). "The Neuropsychopharmacology of Phencyclidine: From NMDA Receptor Hypofunction to the Dopamine Hypothesis of Schizophrenia". Neuropsychopharmacology. 20 (3): 201–225. doi:10.1016/S0893-133X(98)00060-8. ISSN 0893-133X. PMID 10063482.
- Jentsch, J. D.; Taylor, J. R. (October 1, 1999). "Impulsivity resulting from frontostriatal dysfunction in drug abuse: implications for the control of behavior by reward-related stimuli". Psychopharmacology. 146 (4): 373–390. doi:10.1007/PL00005483. ISSN 1432-2072. PMID 10550488. S2CID 23450515.
- Jentsch, J. David; Redmond, D. Eugene; Elsworth, John D.; Taylor, Jane R.; Youngren, Kenneth D.; Roth, Robert H. (August 15, 1997). "Enduring Cognitive Deficits and Cortical Dopamine Dysfunction in Monkeys After Long-Term Administration of Phencyclidine". Science. 277 (5328): 953–955. doi:10.1126/science.277.5328.953. ISSN 0036-8075. PMID 9252326.
- Jentsch, J. David; Tran, Anh; Le, Dung; Youngren, Kenneth D.; Roth, Robert H. (August 1, 1997). "Subchronic phencyclidine administration reduces mesoprefrontal dopamine utilization and impairs prefrontal cortical-dependent cognition in the rat". Neuropsychopharmacology. 17 (2): 92–99. doi:10.1016/S0893-133X(97)00034-1. ISSN 0893-133X. PMID 9252984.

== Personal life ==
Jentsch is openly gay and is part of the organisation 500 Queer Scientists. He uses social media including Twitter to share his research and experiences as a scientist.
