= Alberto Collino =

Italian mathematician (1947–2020)

Alberto Collino (1947 – 12 September 2020) was an Italian mathematician best known for his contributions in the field of algebraic geometry.

Collino was born in Verzuolo, earned a laurea in mathematics in 1970 from the University of Turin, and completed a Ph.D. in 1974 at the Massachusetts Institute of Technology. His dissertation, The Rational Equivalence Ring of Symmetric Products of Curves, was supervised by Arthur Mattuck. He spent his professional career at the University of Turin, beginning as an assistant in 1970 and becoming a full professor in 1984.

He died in Milan.

In 2025, a two-volume collection of papers written in memory of Alberto Collino was published by Birkhäuser in the series "Progress in Mathematics".
