= Arthur Mattuck =

American mathematician (1930–2021)

Arthur Paul Mattuck
- Born: June 11, 1930; Brooklyn, New York, US
- Died: October 8, 2021 (aged 91)
- Education: Swarthmore College (BA); Princeton University (PhD)
- Scientific career
- Workplaces: Massachusetts Institute of Technology
- Thesis: Abelian Varieties over P-Adic Ground Fields (1954)
- Doctoral advisor: Emil Artin
- Doctoral students: Alberto Collino
- Website: math.mit.edu/~apm/

Arthur Paul Mattuck (June 11, 1930 – October 8, 2021) was a professor of mathematics at the Massachusetts Institute of Technology. He is known for his 1998 book, Introduction to Analysis (ISBN 0-13-081132-7) and his differential equations video lectures featured on MIT's OpenCourseWare.

Mattuck was a student of Emil Artin at Princeton University, where he completed his PhD in 1954.

== Recognition ==
In 2012 he became a fellow of the American Mathematical Society.

== Personal life ==
From 1959 to 1977 Mattuck was married to chemist Joan Berkowitz. Mattuck is quoted extensively in Sylvia Nasar's biography of John Nash, A Beautiful Mind.

He was the brother of the physicist Richard Mattuck.

He died on October 8, 2021, at age of 91. He was survived by his daughter Rosemary and her partner Jeffrey Broadman, and three nephews, Allan, Robin, and Martin.
