= Eric Stover =

American human rights activist

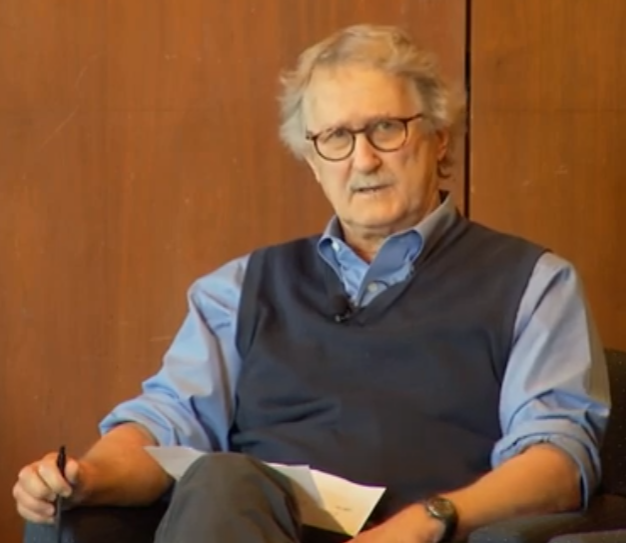
- At the 2023 panel discussion "Slavery in the Economy of the Anthropocene"
- Occupations: Researcher, activist
- Employer: Berkeley Human Rights Center

Eric Stover is an American human rights researcher and advocate and faculty director of the Human Rights Center at the University of California at Berkeley.

== Career ==
Stover officially began his human rights work as a researcher at Amnesty International in London, England, from 1977 to 1980. During this time, the organization won the Nobel Peace Prize for its "campaign against torture," and the United Nations Prize in the Field of Human Rights. Following Amnesty International, Stover became the Director of the Science and Human Rights Program of the American Association for the Advancement of Science. In 1992, Stover served as the executive director of Physicians for Human Rights where he worked on forensic missions to examine mass gravesites for the International Criminal Tribunals for the former Yugoslavia. and Rwanda. While at PHR, Stover performed research on the sociomedical consequences of land mines in war-torn countries such as Cambodia. His research helped launch the International Campaign to Ban Landmines, which, along with the organization's director, Jody Williams, received the Nobel Peace Prize in 1997. He has published seven books and numerous reports and articles for press and scholarly publications.

=== Human Rights Center ===
Stover became the Faculty Director of the Human Rights Center (HRC) at the UC Berkeley School of Law in 1996, two years after the center was established.

The HRC is an interdisciplinary research center which uses science and law to pursue human rights issues. The Human Rights center has conducted investigations or research focusing on sexual violence, human trafficking, torture, public health among vulnerable populations, accountability for war criminals, child soldiers, family reunification, and the applications of advanced technologies to human rights work. The center's reports have examined human rights issues in sub-Saharan Africa, Central America and South America, Southeast Asia, the Balkans, the Middle East, and the United States. In February, 2015, the Human Rights Center was awarded a grant from the MacArthur foundation's program for Creative and Effective Institutions.

== Awards and honors ==
- "Notable Book of the Year for 1999," New York Times Book Review for Witnesses from the Grave: The Stories Bones Tell
- "Best Human Rights Book of 2005," for The Witness: War Crimes and the Promise of Justice in the Hague, American Political Science Association
- Faculty Award for Civic Engagement, 2013. University of California, Berkeley

== Bibliography ==
=== Books ===
- Stover E, Koenig A, Peskin V. Hiding in Plain Sight: The Pursuit of War Crimes Suspects from Nuremberg to the 'War on Terror'. University of California Press, 2015 (in progress).
- Stover E and Fletcher L. The Guantánamo Effect: Exposing the Consequences of U.S. Detention and Interrogation Practices. University of California Press, 2009.
- Stover, Eric. The Witnesses War Crimes and the Promise of Justice in The Hague. University of Pennsylvania Press, 2005.
- Stover E and Abrahams Fredrick and Gilles Peress. A Village Destroyed, May 14, 1999: War Crimes in Kosovo. University of California Press, 2002.
- Stover E and Weinstein H. My Neighbor, My Enemy Justice and Community in the Aftermath of Mass Atrocity with a foreword by Ariel Dorfman. Cambridge University Press, 2004.
- Stover E and Peress G. The Graves: Srebrenica And Vukovar. Scalo Publishers; First Edition, 1998.
- Stover E and Nightingale E. The Breaking of Bodies and Minds: Torture, Psychiatric Abuse, and the Health Professions. W H Freeman & Co (Sd). First Edition, 1985.

=== Articles ===
- Fletcher L and Stover E. "A commitment to justice means more than just closing Gitmo." SF Gate (January 27, 2015).
- Stover E and Peskin V. "The International Criminal Court's risky move." Los Angeles Times (September 17, 2013).
- Stover E, Balthazard M, and Koenig KA. "Confronting Duch: civil party participation in Case 001 at the Extraordinary Chambers in the Courts of Cambodia." International Review of the Red Cross, 2011. (882).
- Stover E, Fletcher L, Koenig A."The Cumulative Effect: A medico-legal approach to United States torture law and policy." (Essex Human Rights Review 2009).
- Stover E, Sisson M, Pham PN, Vinck P. "Justice on Hold: Accountability and Social Reconstruction in Iraq." International Review of the Red Cross 90/869 (2008): 5-28.
- Stover E and Vinck P. "Cyclone Nargis and the Politics of Relief and Reconstruction Aid in Burma (Myanmar)." Journal of the American Medical Association (JAMA) 300/6 (2008): 729–31.
- Stover E and Beyrer C. "Aid and sanctions in Burma." Op-ed in the Boston Globe (June 16, 2007).

=== Academic and professional journals ===
- Eric Stover, Mychelle Balthazard, K. Alexa Koenig, "Confronting Duch: Civil Party Participation at the Extraordinary Chambers in the Courts of Cambodia," International Review of the Red Cross, January 2012.
- K. Alexa Koenig, Eric Stover, Laurel E. Fletcher, "The Cumulative Effect: A Medico Legal Approach to United States Torture Law and Policy," Essex Human Rights Review, Vol 6, No. 1 (December 2009): 145–168.
- Phuong N Pham, Patrick Vinck, Eric Stover, "Returning home: forced conscription, Reintegration, and mental health status of former abductees of the Lord's Resistance Army in northern Uganda," BMC Psychiatry 2009, 9;23.
- Phuong Pham, Patrick Vinck, Eric Stover, "The Lord's Resistance Army and Forced Conscription in Northern Uganda," Human Rights Quarterly 30 (2008):404-411.
- Eric Stover and Patrick Vinck, "Cyclone Nargis and the Politics of Relief and Reconstruction Aid in Burma (Myanmar)," Journal of the American Medical Association 300/6 (2008):729-731.
- Eric Stover, M. Sisson, Phuong Pham, Patrick Vinck, "Justice on Hold: Accountability and Social Reconstruction in Iraq," International Review of the Red Cross 90/869 (2008):5-28.
- Patrick Vinck, Phuong N. Pham, Eric Stover, Harvey M. Weinstein, "Exposure to War Crimes and Implications for Peace Building in Northern Uganda, Journal of the American Medical Association, Vol. 298, No.5, August 1, 2007; 543-554.
- HM Weinstein, LE Fletcher, E Stover, "Human Rights and Mass Disaster: Lessons from the 2004 Tsunami," Asia-Pacific Journal of Public Health 19 (2007): 52–59.
- Eric Stover, Hanny Megally, and Hamia Mufti, "Bremer's 'Gordian Knot': Transitional Justice and the US Occupation of Iraq, Human Rights Quarterly 27 (2005) 830-857.
- Eric Stover et al., "Hidden Slaves: Forced Labor in the United States," Berkeley Journal of International Law 23 (2005) 47–111.
- Eric Stover et al., "Exhumation of Mass Graves in Iraq: Considerations for Forensic Investigations, Humanitarian Needs, and the Demands of Justice," Journal of the American Medical Association Vol. 209, No.5, August 6, 2003: 663–666.
- Eric Stover and Rachel Shigekane, "The Missing in the Aftermath of War:When Do the Needs of Victims' Families and International War Crimes Tribunals Clash," International Review of the Red Cross 2002;848:845-865.
- Eric Stover and Molly Ryan, "Breaking Bread with the Dead," Historical Archeology 2001;1:7-25.
- Paul Geltman and Eric Stover, "Genocide and the Plight of Children in Rwanda," Journal of the American Medical Association, January 1997.
- James C. Cobey, Eric Stover, Jonathan Fine, "Civilian Injuries due to War Mines" Techniques in Orthopaedics 1995;10:259-264.
- Eric Stover, "In the Shadow of Nuremberg: Pursuing War Criminals in the former Yugoslavia and Rwanda," Medicine and Global Survival, September 1995.
- P. Christian Boles, Clyde C. Snow, and Eric Stover, "Forensic DNA Testing on Skeletal Remains from a Mass Grave: A Pilot Project in Guatemala," Journal of Forensic Sciences, May 1995.
- Eric Stover, Allen Keller, James C. Cobey, and Sam Sopeab, "Medical and Social Consequences of Land Mines in Cambodia," Journal of the American Medical Association, 6 August 1994.
- Eric Stover and Rae McGrath, "Land Mines and Human Rights," British Medical Journal, 14 December 1991.
- Eric Stover and Quentin D. Young, "Sudan: Physicians and Human Rights," Journal of the American Medical Association, 26 December 1990.
- Jorgen L. Thomsen, Janet Gruschow, and Eric Stover, "Medicolegal Investigation of Political Killings in El Salvador," The Lancet, 17 June 1989.
- Elena 0. Nightingale and Eric Stover," A Question of Conscience," Journal of the American Medical Association, 23 I 30 May 1986.
- Eric Stover and Elena 0. Nightingale, "The Medical Profession and the Prevention of Torture," New England Journal of Medicine, 25 October 1985.
- Eric Stover, "Scientists Aid Search for Argentina's Desaparecidos," Science, 4 October 1985.
- Eric Stover, "Special Report: Support Urged for Syrian Physicians," New England Journal of Medicine, 22 March 1984.
- Eric Stover, "Fact Finding Mission Visit to the Philippines," Science, 9 March 1984.
- Eric Stover et al., "The Investigation of the Human Remains of the Disappeared in Argentina," The American Journal of Forensic Medicine and Pathology, September 1984.
- Eric Stover and Thomas Eisner, "Human Rights Abuses and the Role of Scientists," Bioscience, December 1982.
- Eric Stover, "New Responses to Attacks on Human Rights of Scientists in Latin America Called For," Science, 6 March 1981.
- Eric Stover, "Support Urged for Persecuted Engineers," Civil Engineering, May 1980.

== Films and photography ==
- Co-Producer, "Past Reckoning", Saybook Productions. PBS, In progress
- Writer and Associate Producer, Searching for Butch and Sundance, NOVA/WGBH & Channel 4, London, 1992
- Executive Producer, Crimes of War., 2001

Photographs have appeared in the New York Times, Newsweek, Parade, Miami Herald, The Boston Globe, Science, New Scientist, TV Guide, Visao, The Scientist, Technology Review, and several reports and books, including in Gerald Posner and John Ware, Mengele: A Complete Story (New York: McGraw Hill, 1985)
