= Jianguo Wu =

Landscape ecologist

Jianguo "Jingle" Wu (邬建国) is a Dean's Distinguished Professor of Sustainability Science at Arizona State University in Tempe, Arizona. He is also known internationally for his research in landscape ecology and urban ecology. His areas of expertise include landscape ecology, biodiversity, sustainability science, ecosystem functioning and urban ecology. He is the author of over 300 publications, 14 books and has translated 1 book from English to Chinese. He has been awarded multiple awards and honors, including being elected as a Fellow for the American Association for the Advancement of Science (AAAS) in 2007 and an Ecological Society of America fellow in 2019. In 2019 and 2020, Wu was chosen as one of the most influential researchers in the world by Web of Science in the fields of Environment and Ecology (2019) and Cross-Field (2020) due to his collective published works being in the top 1% most cited over the last decade. Since 2005, Jianguo Wu has also served as the editor-in-chief of the international publication Landscape Ecology.

== Education ==
Jianguo Wu was born in 1957. He received his B.S. in biology in 1981 from Inner Mongolia University. He then went on to study ecology at Miami University in Oxford, Ohio, where he earned his M.S. in 1987. His master's thesis was titled "A simulation model of energy exchange processes and microenvironment of plant communities". From there, Wu earned his PhD in ecology in 1991 from the same university. For his PhD, he wrote his thesis "Dynamics of landscape islands: A systems simulation modeling approach" under his dissertation director, John L. Vankat. During this time, he also worked with Orie L. Loucks, who is described as being a role model to him.

After completing his PhD, Jianguo Wu was a National Science Foundation postdoctoral fellow at Cornell University and Princeton University from 1991 to 1993. During his postdoc, he worked in the Levin Lab and was mentored by Simon A. Levin.

== Career and research ==
After receiving his B.S. in biology in 1981 from Inner Mongolia University, China, Jianguo Wu began teaching plant ecology there until he started his M.S. in 1985 at Miami University in Oxford, Ohio. During his time in college, Wu reports that he became concerned with the sustainability of ecosystems at multiple scales. Over time, his understanding of sustainability and its complexity increased. He credits reading the book "Our Common Journey: A Transition Toward Sustainability" by the National Research Council, published in 1999, and the article "Sustainability Science" in Science Magazine, published in 2001, with widening his understanding of the different dimensions of sustainability. In 2003, he became involved with Arizona State University (ASU)'s sustainability initiatives. He cites this involvement along with his experience as editor-in-chief at the journal Landscape Ecology with focusing his teaching and research on sustainability. Much of Wu's research has focused on landscape ecology. Based on this research, Wu highlights the importance of different contexts and multiple scales in tackling sustainability issues. "Sustainability science has to be done on multiple scales," says Wu. "Global scale is important. Local scale is important. Regional scale in the middle is very important and operational." Jianguo Wu argues that more research needs to focus on regional analysis as it is the missing link between narrow, local studies and global studies that could help us institute broad changes in the world we live in. Recently, Wu has been studying two major research topics. First, Wu and his team have been studying biodiversity and ecosystem functioning in the grasslands of Mongolia. Second, he has been researching urban landscapes, particularly focusing on China. According to Wu, a main goal of this research is "to integrate urban ecology and landscape ecology so as to produce actionable knowledge for urban sustainability." In his future research, Wu is interested in addressing landscape ecology from many different angles, including how society can create cities that are planned better as the world becomes more urbanized.

Today, Jianguo Wu teaches courses on landscape ecology, ecological modeling, and sustainability science. His areas of expertise include landscape ecology, biodiversity, sustainability science, ecosystem functioning and urban ecology. Currently, Wu is a Dean's Distinguished professor of Sustainability Science in the School of Sustainability, College of Global Futures and in the School of Life Sciences, College of Liberal Arts and Sciences at Arizona State University(ASU) in Tempe, Arizona. He is also an affiliated faculty member of the Center for Biodiversity Outcomes and the Global Institute of Sustainability and Innovation at ASU. Jianguo Wu is also a guest professor at various Chinese institutions, including the Institute of Botany at the Chinese Academy of Sciences, Inner Mongolia University, and Beijing Normal University.

Jianguo Wu has held many different positions during his career. From 1999 to 2000 he was the chair of the Asian Ecology Section for the Ecological Society of America (ESA). According to the ESA, the Asian Ecology Section was founded in 1994 in order to promote ecology research, communication, collaboration and education in Asia. In 2001, Wu served as the program chair for the US chapter of the International Association for Landscape Ecology, now known as the North American Regional Association of the International Association for Landscape Ecology (IALE – North America). Then, from 2001 to 2003 Jianguo Wu served as the Councillor-at-large for the North American Regional Association of the International Association for Landscape Ecology (IALE – North America), formerly the US-IALE. Subsequently, from 2005 to 2006 Wu served on the Board of Scientific Counselors for Ecological Research for the Office of Research and Development, which is part of the U.S. Environmental Protection Agency (EPA).

From 2005 to the present, Jianguo Wu has served as the editor-in-chief for the international journal, Landscape Ecology. From 2007 to 2012, he served as the founding director of the Sino-US Center of Conservation, Energy and Sustainability Science (SUCCESS) at Inner Mongolia University. The goal of this center was "to provide a platform for international collaborations, particularly on use-inspired, interdisciplinary and transdisciplinary research relevant to sustainability issues that occur during the socioeconomic development in Inner Mongolia and its neighboring regions." From 2012 to the present, Wu has served as the founding director of the Center for Human-Environment System Sustainability (CHESS) at Beijing Normal University. The goal of CHESS is to provide a platform for young and graduate level scientists as well as to promote research in the fields of landscape ecology, urban ecology, and sustainability science. Jianguo Wu also serves on the editorial board for the international journal Acta Ecologica Sinca an associate advisor. This journal is a monthly journal sponsored by the Ecological Society of China. This journal's purpose is to promote "the development of and foster research talents for ecological studies in China, so as to contribute to the knowledge innovation, sustainable development and the revitalization of the nation through science and education."

At Arizona State University, Jianguo Wu also serves as an advisor to Arizona State University President's Office on China affairs.

== Awards and honors ==
Jianguo Wu has received multiple awards and honors over his career including:

- 1991–1993 Wu was a National Science Foundation postdoctoral fellow at Cornell University and Princeton University .
- 2001: His book, Landscape Ecology: Pattern, Process, Scale, and Hierarchy won the Award of Outstanding Books in Science and Technology in China
- 2006: Jianguo Wu received the Award for Science Diplomacy, formerly the Award for International Scientific Cooperation, from the American Association for the Advancement of Science (AAAS). He was chosen for due to his "pioneering efforts and outstanding contributions to international initiatives in support of sustainability science, specifically his conceptual modeling activities, commitment to landscape ecological research, and mentoring of young scholars."
- 2007: Wu was elected a Fellow for the American Association for the Advancement of Science (AAAS)
- 2009: Jianguo Wu was named a Leopold Leadership Fellow under the Leopold Leadership Program, run by the Woods Institute for the Environment at Stanford University. This program has since been renamed the Earth Leadership Program.
- 2010: Wu was chosen to receive the Distinguished Landscape Ecologist Award from the North American Regional Association of the International Association for Landscape Ecology (IALE – North America). According to the IALE, "the intent of this award is to specifically recognize those unique individuals whose thinking and writing have helped to shape the field of landscape ecology. This award highlights those scholars whose scientific endeavors pervade our discipline and its continuing development. This award is ordinarily given for outstanding scientific achievement over a period of a decade or more, and it is the most prestigious honor bestowed by our Chapter."
- 2011: Jianguo Wu received the Outstanding Scientific Achievements Award from the International Association of Landscape Ecology (IALE)
- 2012: Wu received the Distinguished Service Award from the North American Regional Association of the International Association for Landscape Ecology (IALE – North America). According to the IALE, "the award for Distinguished Service recognizes individuals who have contributed exceptionally to IALE – North America."
- 2012: Wu was chosen to receive the Outstanding International Scientific and Technological Cooperation Award from the Government of Inner Mongolia Autonomous Region
- 2019: Wu was elected as an Ecological Society of America (ESA) fellow. According to the ESA, Wu was elected for "outstanding contributions to landscape ecology, urban ecology, and sustainability science, particularly in the areas of hierarchical patch dynamics, spatial scaling, habitat fragmentation and biodiversity, ecological impacts of urbanization, and landscape sustainability."
- 2019: Jianguo Wu received the Highly Cited Researchers Award by the Web of Science™ in the category of Environment and Ecology. To receive this award, researchers must rank within the top 1% of their field for number of citations in the last decade.
- 2020: Wu was awarded the Highly Cited Researchers Award by the Clarivate™ Web of Science™ in the category of Cross-Field. According to the Web of Science, this award is given to "the true pioneers in their fields over the last decade, demonstrated by the production of multiple highly-cited papers that rank in the top 1% by citations for field and year in the Web of Science™.

=== Grants ===
Wu has been awarded multiple grants to fund his research including an EPA grant as a principal investigator for "A Hierarchical Patch Dynamics Approach to Regional Modeling and Scaling" in partnership with Douglas Green.

As a NSF postdoctoral fellow, Wu received a National Science Foundation grant to fund his postdoctoral research under the mentorship of Simon A. Levin in 1991. Since, then, Wu has received at least four National Science Foundation grants as both principal investigator and co-principal investigator to study biodiversity and urban ecology.

== Publications ==
=== Articles ===
Jianguo Wu has authored over 300 publications during his career. While working on his postdoc, he published multiple works including a project titled "Grasslands and Grassland Sciences in Northern China" alongside Orie L. Loucks, which was published in two parts in 1992. While finishing his postdoc, he also began working on the topic of hierarchical patch dynamics paradigm with Loucks, which Wu would continue after finishing his postdoc, publishing in 1992 and 1995. In 1995, Wu and Loucks published what Loucks described as "the most important paper I've written" on hierarchical patch dynamics for the journal The Quarterly Review in Biology, titled "From Balance of Nature to Hierarchical Patch Dynamics: A Paradigm Shift in Ecology." This remains one of Wu's most cited works. Today, he is considered to be a highly influential researcher in his field; in 2019 and 2020 he won Web of Science's Highly Influential Researcher Award in the fields of Environment and Ecology (2019) and Cross-Field (2020). This award is given to researchers who are in the top 1% of their field by number of citations in the last decade.

Some of his works include:

- Wu, Jianguo, & Loucks, Orie L. (1995). From Balance of Nature to Hierarchical Patch Dynamics: A Paradigm Shift in Ecology. The Quarterly Review of Biology, 70(4), 439–466. From Balance of Nature to Hierarchical Patch Dynamics: A Paradigm Shift in Ecology
- Wu, Jianguo, & Hobbs, Richard. (2002). Key issues and research priorities in landscape ecology: An idiosyncratic synthesis. Landscape Ecology, 17(4), 355–365. Key issues and research priorities in landscape ecology: An idiosyncratic synthesis
- Wu, Jianguo, et al. (2003). Three-Gorges Dam: Experiment in Habitat Fragmentation? Science (American Association for the Advancement of Science), 300(5623), 1239–1240.
- Wu, J. (2004). Effects of changing scale on landscape pattern analysis: scaling relations. Landscape Ecology, 19(2), 125–138. Effects of changing scale on landscape pattern analysis: scaling relations
- Wu, J. (2013). Landscape sustainability science: ecosystem services and human well-being in changing landscapes. Landscape Ecology, 28(6), 999–1023. Landscape sustainability science: ecosystem services and human well-being in changing landscapes
- Wu, J. (2014). Urban ecology and sustainability: The state-of-the-science and future directions. Landscape and Urban Planning, 125, 209–221. Urban ecology and sustainability: The state-of-the-science and future directions
- Bai, Yongfei, Han, Xingguo, Wu, Jianguo, Chen, Zuozhong, & Li, Linghao. (2004). Ecosystem stability and compensatory effects in the Inner Mongolia grassland. Nature (London), 431(7005), 181–184. Ecosystem stability and compensatory effects in the Inner Mongolia grassland
- Grimm, N. B, Faeth, S. H, Golubiewski, N. E, Redman, C. L, Wu, J, Bai, X, & Briggs, J. M. (2008). Global Change and the Ecology of Cities. Science (American Association for the Advancement of Science), 319(5864), 756–760. Global Change and the Ecology of Cities
- Forman, Richard T. T, & Wu, Jianguo. (2016). Where to put the next billion people. Nature (London), 537(7622), 608–611. Where to put the next billion people

=== Books ===
Jianguo Wu has authored 14 books in both Chinese and English on the topics of ecology and landscape ecology.

1. Y. Gao and J. Wu (eds). 2017. Lectures in Modern Ecology (VIII): Advances in Community, Ecosystem and Landscape Ecology. Higher Education Press, Beijing.
2. Barrett, G.W., T.L. Barrett, and J.G. Wu (eds). 2015. History of Landscape Ecology in the United States. Springer, New York. ISBN 978-1493922758
3. Wu, J.G. and S.Q. An (eds). 2013. Lectures in Modern Ecology (VI): Global Climate Change and Ecological Patterns and Processes. Higher Education Press, Beijing.
4. Hong, S.K., J. Wu, J.E. Kim, and N. Nakagoshi (eds). 2011. Landscape Ecology in Asian Cultures. Springer, Dordrecht, The Netherlands. 334 pp. ISBN 978-4431877981
5. Wu, J. G. and F.M. Li (eds). 2011. Lectures in Modern Ecology (V): Large-Scale Ecology and Sustainability Science. Higher Education Press, Beijing. 381 pp.
6. Wu, J. and J. Yang (eds). 2009. Lectures in Modern Ecology (IV): Theory and Applications. Higher Education Press, Beijing. 392 pp.
7. Carriero, M., Y. Song, and J. Wu (eds). 2008. Ecology, Planning, and Management of Urban Forests: International Perspectives. Springer, New York. 467 pp. ISBN 978-0387714257
8. Gu, B., J. Wu, J. Chen, and Y. Wu (eds). 2008. Green Careers. Higher Education Press, Beijing.
9. Wu, J. and R. Hobbs (eds). 2007. Key Topics in Landscape Ecology. Cambridge University Press, Cambridge. 297 pp. ISBN 978-1139462143
10. Wu, J. 2007. Landscape Ecology: Pattern, Process, Scale and Hierarchy. 2nd Edition. Higher Education Press, Beijing. 266 pp.
11. Wu, J., J. Ge, X. Han, Z. Yu, and D. Zhang (eds). 2007. Lectures in Modern Ecology (III): Advances and Key Topics. Higher Education Press, Beijing. 383 pp.
12. Wu, J., B. Jones, H. Li, and O. L. Loucks (Eds). 2006. Scaling and Uncertainty Analysis in Ecology. Springer, Dordrecht, The Netherlands. 351 pp. ISBN 978-1402046636
13. Wu, J., X. Han, and J. Huang (eds). 2002. Lectures in Modern Ecology (II): From Basic Science to Environmental Issues. Science and Technology Press, Beijing. 229 pp.
14. Wu, J. 2000. Landscape Ecology: Pattern, Process, Scale and Hierarchy. 1st Edition. Higher Education Press, Beijing.

In addition, Wu has translated one book to Chinese from English.

- Forman, R.T.T. 2014. Urban Ecology: Science of Cities. Cambridge University Press. [Chinese edition translated by J. Wu et al. 2017, Higher Education Press, Beijing.
