= Encieh Erfani =

Iranian cosmologist (born 1982)

Enciah Erfani (born 1982) is an Iranian cosmologist whose research concerns cosmic inflation and the creation of primordial black holes. After ending her tenure track faculty position in Iran, she works in Canada as a joint postdoctoral research fellow at the Perimeter Institute for Theoretical Physics and the Canadian Institute for Theoretical Astrophysics.

== Education and career ==
Erfani was born in Tabriz in 1982. After growing up in love with stargazing, Erfani studied physics as an undergraduate at Tabriz University, the first in her family with a university education. After graduating in 2003, and a master's degree from Azarbaijan Shahid Madani University in Tabriz in 2006, she went to the University of Bonn in Germany for doctoral study with Manuel Drees in the university's Physikalisches Institut, with support from the International Centre for Theoretical Physics in Trieste, Italy. There, she completed a Ph.D. in theoretical astro-particle physics in 2012, with the dissertation Inflation and Dark Matter Primordial Black Holes. Returning to Iran, she became a postdoctoral researcher at the Institute for Research in Fundamental Sciences from 2012 until 2015, when she took a tenure track assistant professor position at the Institute for Advanced Studies in Basic Sciences, a public advanced research center and university in Zanjan.

From August to November of 2022, Erfani was a research visitor at the National Autonomous University of Mexico in Mexico City. While there, Mahsa Amini died in custody in Iran after being arrested for not wearing a hijab, sparking the widespread Mahsa Amini protests, and Erfani resigned her tenure-track faculty position a few months before the termination. She decided to stay abroad and not return to Iran, while asking other tenure professors in Iran to resign and protest, even though she herself chose to remain abroad. Since that time, she has held postdoctoral research positions at the International Centre for Theoretical Physics from 2022 to 2023, at the University of Mainz beginning in 2023, with the support of an Alexander von Humboldt Research Fellowship, and at the Perimeter Institute beginning in 2025, after an eight-month wait for a Canadian visa.

She has also been an advocate for women's rights and women in astronomy, including starting a women's astronomy club in Iran, organizing a 2018 physics workshop and ongoing international cooperation with Kabul University in Afghanistan. As a director of the Iranian Astronomy Society, she founded its female branch. She also co-founded the International Community of Iranian Academics, an organization of Iranian diaspora academics focused on raising awareness of issues concerning the global Iranian academic community.

== Recognition ==
Erfani was the 2025 recipient of the American Association for the Advancement of Science Award for Scientific Freedom and Responsibility.

She was elected to the Global Young Academy in 2021. She was elected to the Royal Society of Canada College of New Scholars, Artists and Scientists in 2025.
