= Adrian R. Morrison =

American neuroscientist (1935–2021)

- Born: 5 November 1935; Philadelphia, Pennsylvania
- Died: 4 August 2021 (aged 85)

Adrian R. Morrison (1935 – 4 August 2021) was an American neuroscientist and vivisection activist known for researching the neurobiological mechanisms of sleep. He was President of the Sleep Research Society and was the 1991 AAAS Scientific Freedom and Responsibility Award recipient. Morrison was a firm supporter of animal experimentation for biomedical research and an opponent of animal rights.

== Biography ==
Morrison was born in Philadelphia, Pennsylvania. Morrison graduated from Franklin & Marshall College in 1957 and obtained a veterinary degree from Cornell University in 1960. He obtained a Masters from Cornell University in 1962 and PhD in anatomy from University of Pennsylvania in 1964. He completed postdoctoral training in sleep research at the University of Pisa, Italy. In 1966, he joined Penn's School of Veterinary Medicine as an associate professor of anatomy in the department of veterinary biology and was promoted to professor in 1974.

From 2001 to 2003, he was the president at the World Federation of Sleep Research Societies. In 1991 he held the role of visiting professorship at London's Royal Society of Medicine. Morrison was a collaborator at the: Unit for Experimental Psychiatry, the Institute of Pennsylvania Hospital, and in the Graduate Group in Anatomy, and the Graduate Group in Comparative Medical Sciences.

Morrison was a consultant and member of the Institute of Neurological Sciences, University of Pennsylvania, a member of the executive board at the Human Clinical Sleep Research Center, was on the executive committee and advisory board, Center for Sleep and Respiratory Neurobiology, and the executive committee of the Penn Sleep Academic Award (NIH Program). He also chaired the advisory board of the Center for Sleep and Circadian Neurobiology.

In addition to these roles Morrison was: the chairman of the Sleep Home Pages Board of Governors, sat on the Environmental Economists Advisory Council to The National Center for Public Policy Research and was on the External Scientific Advisory Board for the Air Force Office of Scientific Research PRET Center on Countermeasures for Jet Lag and Sleep Deprivation.

He was married to Olive R. Morrison. They had five children.

== Animal experimentation ==
Morrison was a supporter of animal experimentation for biomedical research. He publicly defended a fellow neuroscientist who was investigated for cruelty to animals in his research. He supported the animal research of Dr. John Orem. This provoked criticism from animal rights activists and a raid on his laboratory by the Animal Liberation Front.

In 1991, he received the AAAS award “for his dedicated promotion of the responsible use of animals in research and his courageous stand in the face of great personal risk against attempts to curtail animal research essential to public health.” Morrison contributed a chapter to the book Why Animal Experimentation Matters, published in 2001. He argued that animal rights activists distort the research of scholars and use misleading evidence to support an animal rights agenda.

In 2009, he authored An Odyssey with Animals: A Veterinarian's Reflections on the Animal Rights & Welfare Debate, which defended biomedical research on laboratory animals and criticized the arguments of animal rights activists. Morrison described the animal rights movement as "the promotion of beliefs among the untutored by dishonest presentations of the ways animals are used by humans".

== Selected publications ==
Books

Morrison co-edited: Changing Concepts of the Nervous System (Academic Press), Brain Mechanisms of Sleep (Raven Press), Progress in Psychobiology and Physiological Psychology (Academic Press), Progress in Psychobiology and Physiological Psychology (Academic Press, Vol. 16 and Vol. 17), An analysis of the animal rights movement: its thinking, methods and successes. Progress in Psychobiology and Physiological Psychology (Academic Press, Vol. 18). In 2010, he authored An Odyssey with Animals: A Veterinarian's Reflections on the Animal Rights & Welfare Debate.

Papers

- Animal Research Is Vital to Medicine (1997)
- Perverting medical history in the service of "animal rights" (2002)
