= Eliezer Rabinovici =

Israeli theoretical physicist (born 1946)

- 'אליעזר רבינוביץ
- Born: 27 May 1946 (age 80); Jerusalem, Mandatory Palestine
- Education: Weizmann Institute of Science
- Scientific career
- Fields: Physics
- Workplaces: CERN; Hebrew University of Jerusalem

Eliezer Rabinovici (Hebrew: 'אליעזר רבינוביץ; born 1946) is an Israeli theoretical physicist. He is emeritus Professor of Physics (Leon H. and Ada G. Miller Chair) at The Racah Institute of Physics, Hebrew University of Jerusalem, working on theoretical high-energy physics, in particular quantum field theory and string theory.

== Biography ==
He received his BSc (1969) and MSc (1971) degrees and completed his PhD (1974) at the Weizmann Institute of Science. He was a postdoctoral fellow at Fermilab (1975-1976) and at Lawrence Berkeley Lab (1977). He has been at the Hebrew University since 1978, first as Senior Lecturer, Associate Professor (1981), and Professor (1985). He was chair of the Racah Institute of Physics, as well as director of the Israel Institute for Advanced Studies (2005-2012).

He has held various international scientific responsibilities: chair of the Israeli Committee for High Energy Physics, member of the editorial board of JHEP and Nuclear Physics B journals, Blaise Pascal International chair at Paris VI and École normale supérieure (France) (2013), and Louis Michel visiting chair at the IHES, France (2015). In 2019, he was a co-recipient of the AAAS Award for Science Diplomacy for his 18-years-long leadership of the SESAME light source project in Jordan that has effectively stimulated scientific activity and cooperation among the Middle East countries. In 2021, he was elected president of the CERN Council.
