= Madeleine Jacobs =

American scientist

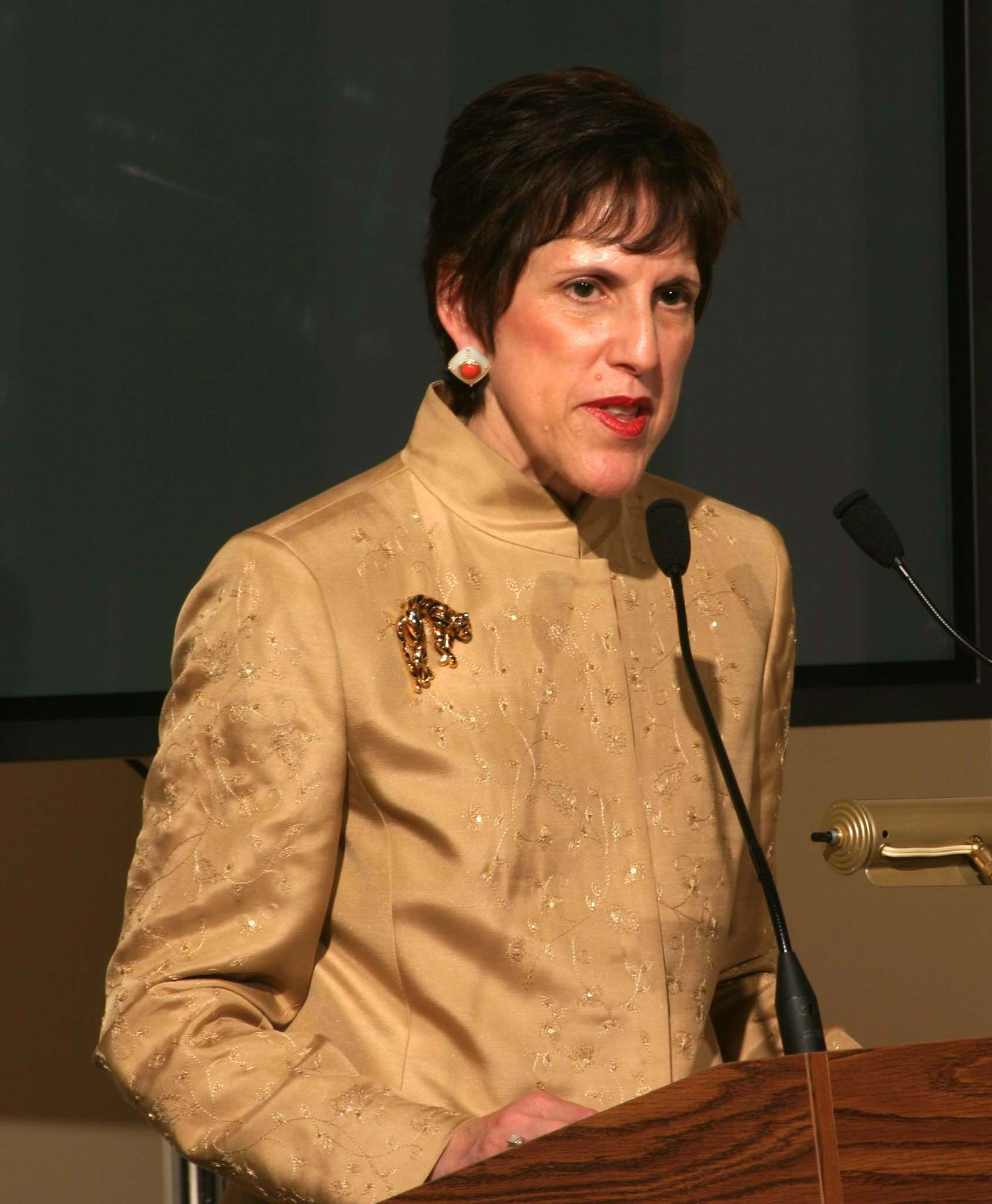
- Madeleine Jacobs in 2004
- Born: November 11, 1946 (age 79); Washington, D.C., U.S.
- Education: George Washington University (BS) University of Maryland (MS)

Madeleine Jacobs (born November 11, 1946) is an American executive businesswoman. Shewas the CEO of the American Chemical Society (ACS) from 2004 to 2014, and the president and CEO of the Council of Scientific Society Presidents from 2015 to 2016.

== Early life and education ==
Jacobs was born in Washington, D.C., to Joseph and Helen Reines, respectively a concert bassoonist and a secretary. Jacobs earned her B.S. in chemistry from George Washington University in 1968 with a full scholarship. After bachelor's degree, she completed course works for a master's degree in organic chemistry at University of Maryland College Park in 1969. Jacobs received an honorary Doctor of Science degree from George Washington University in 2003.

== Career ==
Jacobs began her career in science communications in 1969, working as a reporter for Chemical and Engineering News (C&EN). In 1972, she left C&EN to work for National Institutes of Health and the National Bureau of Standards (now the National Institute of Standards & Technology), where she worked for two years. Jacobs then moved to Smithsonian Institution to work as a chief science writer in 1979. She was promoted to director of the Office of Public Affairs in 1987, the position she held until 1993. During her time at Smithsonian, Jacobs' work in outreach programs toward underrepresented communities has been recognized and earned her the Smithsonian's Secretary's Gold Medal for Exceptional Service in 1993.

Jacobs returned to C&EN as a managing editor in 1993. After being promoted to editor-in-chief in 1995, she became the first female CEO of the ACS in 2004, after the previous CEO John K. Crum retired in late 2003. She was also the first person to hold that position without having a PhD.

=== Advocacy ===
Under the slogan of "The Smithsonian is for everyone," which was coined during her time at Smithsonian, Jacobs developed a variety of outreach programs that earned her the Smithsonian's Secretary's Gold Medal for Exceptional Service.

When Jacobs first joined C&EN in 1969, she was the only woman reporter among magazine's staffs. This led to her work dissecting the challenges that women chemists face, which was the first major story of this sort in C&EN. Jacobs also initiated the annual release of the "scorecard," where C&EN tracks how the academia and the industry are doing in hiring women chemists.

== Recognition ==
- 1993: Smithsonian's Secretary's Gold Medal for Exceptional Service
- 2003: ACS Award for Encouraging Women into Careers in the Chemical Sciences
- 2004: American Crystallographic Association Public Service Award
- 2006–2007: Sylvia M. Stoesser Lecturer in Chemistry, University of Illinois
