= He Jianguo =

Chinese contemporary artist

He Jianguo (Chinese: 何建国，梨花书屋主人, 1951–2021) is a contemporary Chinese idiosyncratic. He Jianguo is regarded as a twentieth-century artist who is continuing the literati tradition. His brushstrokes and calligraphy are unorthodox and he has no fear of turning his back on traditional methods. He draws heavily on traditional subjects, but offers his own interpretation and takes joy in depicting typical Beijing scenes and the life of his family and friends. As a strong based on Chinese ink artist, he studied privately with many Chinese calligraphy top masters for traditional techniques. In the meanwhile the freedom expressed in his works can be seen as the direct result of not having endured a restrictive art school education.

He seeks to unite the scholaramateur aesthetic, Chinese brush work and certain compositional principle interest in Formalism. Being a great fan of artists such as Matisse, Picasso, Cézanne and Kandinsky, He Jianguo uses principles of rhythm to compose his paintings and grid like structure to order the picture surface.

Ink painters are generally labelled conservative, irrespective of their work, because they do not sever ties with Chinese tradition. He Jianguo is not part of the 'avant-garde' but he is one of the few ink painters who are working creatively with what in lesser hands is a stultifying tradition. He seeks to achieve a union of Chinese and Western artistic languages that is relevant to themselves.

== Bibliography ==
=== Permanent Collection ===
Collection of New South Wales Art Gallery, Australia

Year	Title	Place of Origin	Credit
Mid-Late 20th Century	Serenity (Calligraphy)	China	Gift of Sun Yu 1990
Mid-Late 20th Century	Drinking under the Moon	China	Anonymous Gift 1990
1985	Portrait of Chen Lang	China	Purchased 1993
1987	Still life	China	Purchased 1993

=== Publications ===
Year	Title	Author	Publisher	Notes	
2006	Rule of Beauty	He Jianguo, Zhang Zikang	Hebei Education Publishing	ISBN 7-5434-5967-1	
2006	Today's Chinese Calligraphy Artist He Jianguo	He Jianguo	Hebei Education Publishing	ISBN 7-5434-6405-5	
2006	Chinese Most Representative Artist Series	He Jianguo, Linuo	Today Art Museum, China	-	
2006	Chinese Paintings: Artist of today He Jianguo	He Jianguo, XuLei	Today Art Museum, China	-	
2006	INK: Whiteley and others	He Jianguo	The Brett Whiteley Studio	New South Wales, Australia	-
2004	The Porcelain from He Jianguo	He Jianguo	Hebei Education Publishing	ISBN 7-5434-5130-1	
2003	The Asian Collections Art Gallery of New South Wales	He Jianguo, Jackie Menzies	Art Gallery of New South Wales	-	
1998	Contemporary Chinese Artist He Jianguo	He Jianguo	Hebei Education Publishing	ISBN 7-5434-3168-8	
1995	Art of the Brush: Chinese & Japanese Painting Calligraphy	He Jianguo, Jackie Menzies	Trustees of the Art Gallery of New South Wales	-	
1994	The Art Gallery of New South Wales collection	He Jianguo, Ewen McDonald	Art Gallery of New South Wales	-	
1993	Kreatief: Literair En Kunstkritisch Tijdschrift	He Jianguo, Mieke Bongers	Belgium	-	
1992	New Art From China-Post-Mao Product	He Jianguo, Claire Roberts	Trustees of the Art Gallery of New South Wales	-	
