= June E. Osborn =

American physician and researcher

June E. Osborn is an American physician who has served as an expert advisor on numerous urgent medical and health issues that include infectious diseases and their vaccines, virology, and public health policy as well as publishing research on these subjects. Osborn currently works on public health policy with the Centers for Disease Control and Prevention, The World Health Organization, The National Institutes of Health, and The Food and Drug Administration.

== Early life ==
June E. Osborn was born in Endicott, New York on May 28, 1937 to Leslie Varmus and Dora Wrist. The family moved to Madison, Wisconsin in 1950 due to her father being offered a job position as the director of the state's mental hygiene department and professor of psychiatry at The University of Wisconsin. Shortly after moving Osborn's mother began a second career as a psychiatric social worker. Upon studying chemistry in Ohio at Oberlin College, Osborn decided that she did not want to be a physician, but rather that she wanted to go into teaching and researching as her profession.

== Education ==
Osborn began her studies at Oberlin College where she received her A.B. degree in 1957. Osborn continued her education in Cleveland at Case Western Reserve University. It was while she was here that she met and worked with Dr. Frederick C. Robbins, who shared the 1953 Nobel Prize in physiology, whom through his work inspired her to study virology.

Osborn received her M.D. from Case Western Reserve University in 1961. She then spent three years training at Boston Children’s and Massachusetts General Hospitals as a pediatric resident. After she was finished there she spent two years at Johns Hopkins University School of Medicine and also The University of Pittsburgh as a postdoctoral fellow in infectious diseases and virology.

== Career ==
Osborn was on the faculty of The University of Wisconsin-Madison Medical School from 1966 to 1984 as a professor in the Medical Microbiology Department and also the Department of Pediatrics. She was appointed associate dean for biological sciences at The University of Wisconsin Graduate School in 1975. In 1984 Osborn was offered a position as the dean of The School of Public Health at The University of Michigan so she decided to leave Wisconsin.

She later on became the dean and professor of epidemiology, pediatrics, and also communicable diseases at The School of Public Health in Michigan. While serving as dean, Osborn set up a post-doctoral program for minority scholars to assist them in preparing for growth and success in faculty positions. Osborn remained serving as the dean until 1993.

She was elected to membership in The Institute of Medicine in 1986 and from 1995 through 2000 she was a member of its governing council. Later on in 1994 she was elected to fellowship in The American Academy of Arts and Sciences. Osborn went on to be the sixth president of the Josiah Macy, Jr. Foundation in New York in 1996.

Osborn has achieved international recognition for her events during the AIDS epidemic. Throughout the 1980s and 90s Osborn had several senior positions that include The Lung and Blood Institute Advisory Committee on AIDS, The National Institutes of Health, The National Advisory Committee for The Robert Wood Johnson Foundation's AIDS Health Services Project, and The United States National Commission on AIDS. Osborn was an active member of The Global Commission on AIDS of the World Health Organization. Throughout the height of the AIDS epidemic in the 80s and 90s Osborn gave many speeches on and wrote many articles about AIDS, HIV, and the public health and policy issues that accompanied them.

Osborn retired from active faculty status of professor of epidemiology in the School of Public Health and professor of pediatrics and communicable diseases on September 30, 1996.

Osborn is currently in New York serving as a member of The Boards of the Corporation for Supportive Housing, The Center for Health Care Strategies in New Jersey, and the Legal Action Center. She is also one of the chairs on the Physician Leadership on National Drug Policy, an organization based out of Brown University.
