= Edythe D. London =

American pharmacologist (1948–2026)

Edythe Danick London (September 14, 1948 – August 25, 2026) was an American pharmacologist. She was the Thomas and Katherine Pike Professor of Addiction Studies, and Director of the UCLA Laboratory of Molecular Pharmacology at the David Geffen School of Medicine University of California at Los Angeles. London received her Ph.D. in Pharmacology from the University of Maryland (Baltimore). She did a post-doctoral fellowship at Johns Hopkins University School of Medicine.

Prior to joining the UCLA faculty, she was a Senior Scientist at the National Institute on Drug Abuse for 23 years and a member of the faculty at the Johns Hopkins University School of Medicine. She was known internationally for her work on drug addiction as well as other addictive disorders, such as tobacco and nicotine dependence. She has been a pioneer in the development and use of advanced brain imaging techniques to study the effects of drugs, tobacco and other substances of abuse on brain function, including nuclear medicine studies such as Positron Emission Tomography (PET), and functional magnetic resonance imaging (fMRI). Her UCLA laboratory engaged in a wide range of scientific studies as well as the development and testing of new medications. The Web of Science lists several hundred articles published in peer-reviewed journals that have been cited over 13,000 times, leading to an h-index of 63.

Her house in Beverly Hills, California was vandalized on October 23, 2007, in an act credited to an animal activist group Animal Liberation Front by breaking a window of the house and inserting a garden hose which flooded the house. Over $50,000 damage was reported. Subsequently, her house was again attacked and damaged by a firebomb left at the front door on Tuesday, February 5, 2008. No one was home at the time. A statement issued by the North American Animal Liberation Press Office claimed that animal liberationists were responsible for placing the device.

London died on August 25, 2026, aged 77.
