= X-ray scattering techniques =

Family of analytical techniques

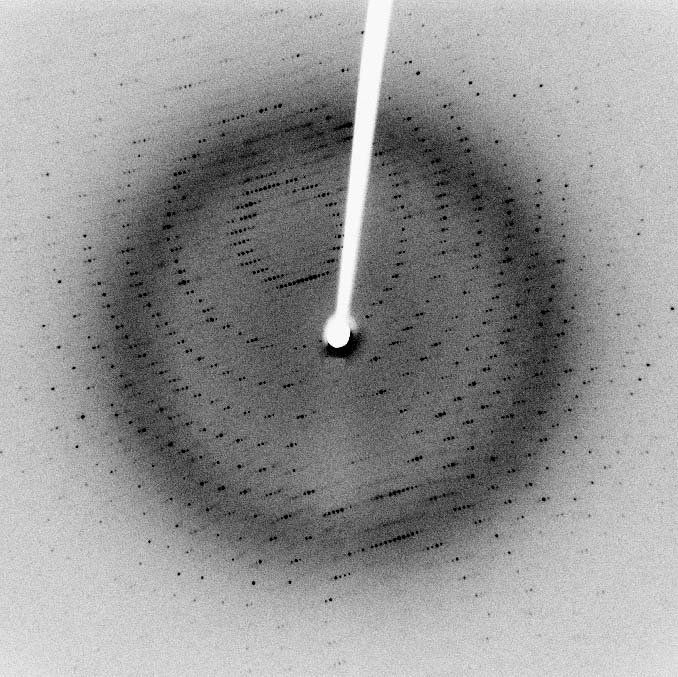
This is an X-ray diffraction pattern formed when X-rays are focused on a crystalline material, in this case a protein. Each dot, called a reflection, forms from the coherent interference of scattered X-rays passing through the crystal.

X-ray scattering techniques are a family of analytical techniques which reveal information about the crystal structure, chemical composition, and physical properties of materials and thin films. These techniques are based on observing the scattered intensity of an X-ray beam hitting a sample as a function of incident and scattered angle, polarization, and wavelength or energy.

X-ray diffraction is sometimes considered a sub-set of X-ray scattering, where the scattering is elastic and the scattering object is crystalline, so that the resulting pattern contains sharp spots analyzed by X-ray crystallography (as in the Figure). However, both scattering and diffraction are related general phenomena and the distinction has not always existed. Thus Guinier's classic text from 1963 is titled "X-ray diffraction in Crystals, Imperfect Crystals and Amorphous Bodies" so 'diffraction' was clearly not restricted to crystals at that time.

== Scattering techniques ==
=== Elastic scattering ===
- X-ray diffraction, sometimes called Wide-angle X-ray diffraction (WAXD)
- Small-angle X-ray scattering (SAXS) probes structure in the nanometer to micrometer range by measuring scattering intensity at scattering angles 2θ close to 0°.
- X-ray reflectivity is an analytical technique for determining thickness, roughness, and density of single layer and multilayer thin films.
- Wide-angle X-ray scattering (WAXS), a technique concentrating on scattering angles 2θ larger than 5°.

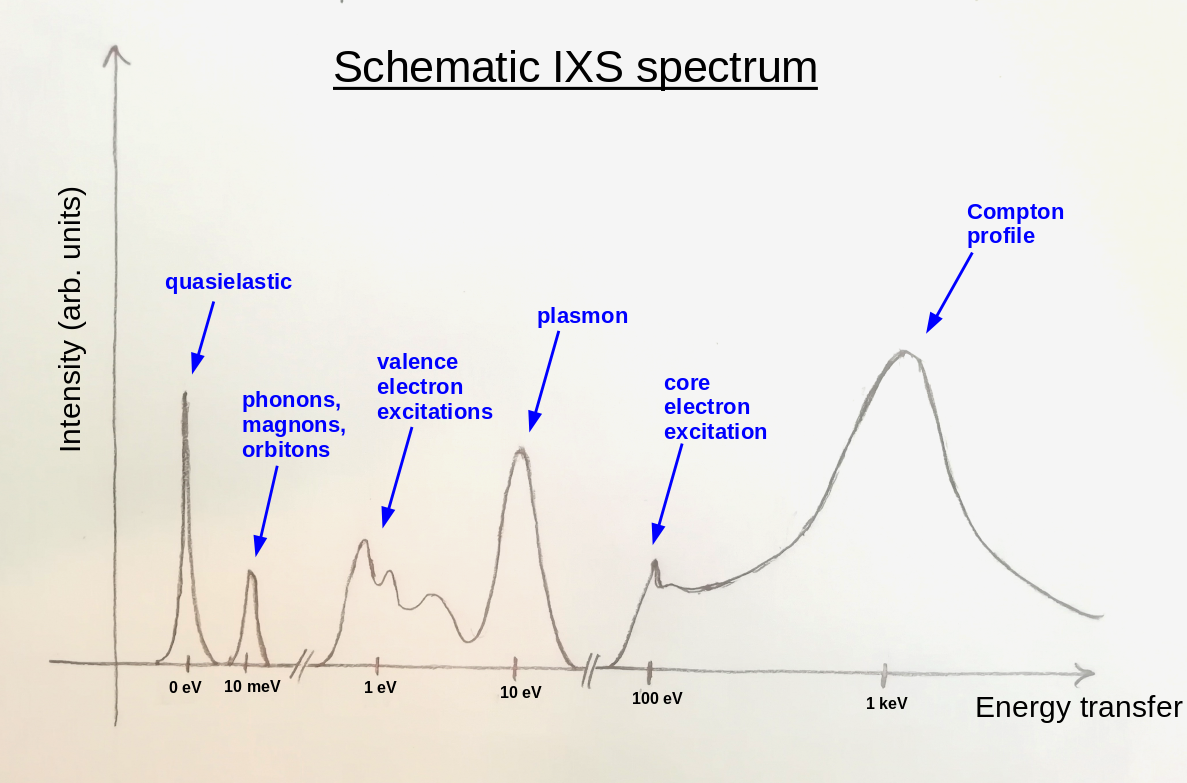
Spectrum of various inelastic scattering processes that can be probed with inelastic X-ray scattering (IXS).

=== Inelastic X-ray scattering (IXS) ===
In IXS the energy and angle of inelastically scattered X-rays are monitored, giving the dynamic structure factor $S(\mathbf{q},\omega)$. From this many properties of materials can be obtained, the specific property depending on the scale of the energy transfer. The table below, listing techniques, is adapted from. Inelastically scattered X-rays have intermediate phases and so in principle are not useful for X-ray crystallography. In practice X-rays with small energy transfers are included with the diffraction spots due to elastic scattering, and X-rays with large energy transfers contribute to the background noise in the diffraction pattern.

Technique	Typical Incident Energy, keV	Energy transfer range, eV	Information on:
Compton scattering	100	1,000	Fermi Surface Shape
Resonant IXS (RIXS)	4-20	0.1 - 50	Electronic Structure & Excitations
Non-Resonant IXS (NRIXS)	10	0.1 - 10	Electronic Structure & Excitations
X-ray Raman scattering	10	50 - 1000	Absorption Edge Structure, Bonding, Valence
High resolution IXS	10	0.001 - 0.1	Atomic Dynamics, Phonon Dispersion

== See also ==
- Anomalous scattering
- Anomalous X-ray scattering
- Backscatter
- Crystallography
- Materials science
- Metallurgy
- Mineralogy
- Rachinger correction
- Structure determination
- Ultrafast x-ray
- X-rays
- X-ray generator
