= X-ray emission spectroscopy =

Emission of secondary X-rays from a material excited by high-energy X-rays

X-ray emission spectroscopy (XES) is a form of X-ray spectroscopy in which a core electron is excited by an incident X-ray photon and then this excited state decays by emitting an X-ray photon to fill the core hole. The energy of the emitted photon is the energy difference between the involved electronic levels. The analysis of the energy dependence of the emitted photons is the aim of the X-ray emission spectroscopy. XES is also sometimes referred to as X-ray fluorescence (XRF) spectroscopy, and while the terms can be used interchangeably, XES more often describes high energy resolution techniques while XRF studies a wider energy range at lower resolution.

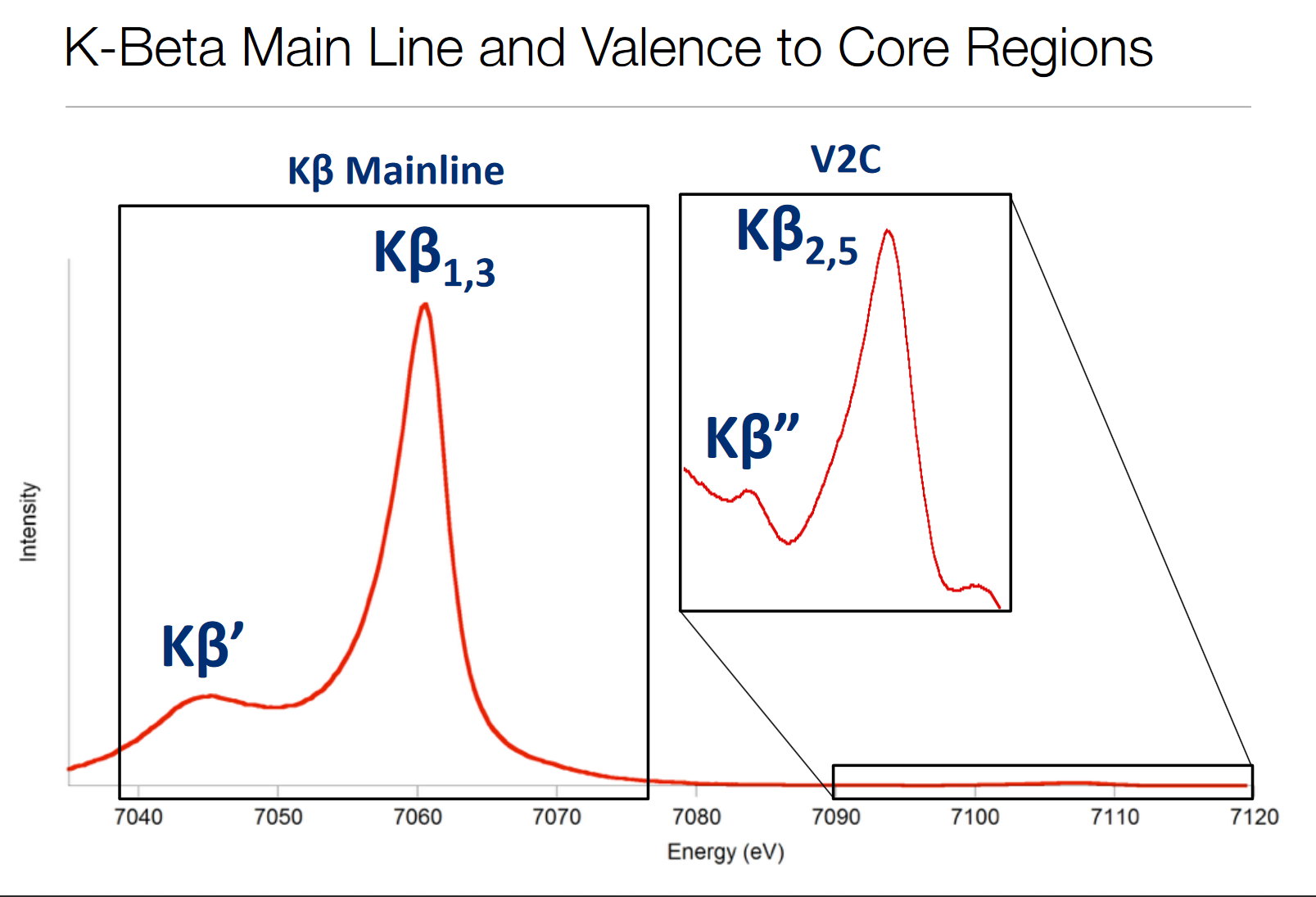
Fig. 1: K-beta mainline and V2C

There are several types of XES and can be categorized as non-resonant XES (XES), which includes $K_{\beta}$-measurements, valence-to-core (VtC/V2C)-measurements, and ($K_{\alpha}$)-measurements, or as resonant XES (RXES or RIXS), which includes XXAS+XES 2D-measurement, high-resolution XAS, 2p3d RIXS, and Mössbauer-XES-combined measurements. In addition, Soft X-ray emission spectroscopy (SXES) is used in determining the electronic structure of materials by studying transitions between electron shells that are closer to the valence level.

== History ==
The first XES experiments were published by Lindh and Lundquist in 1924

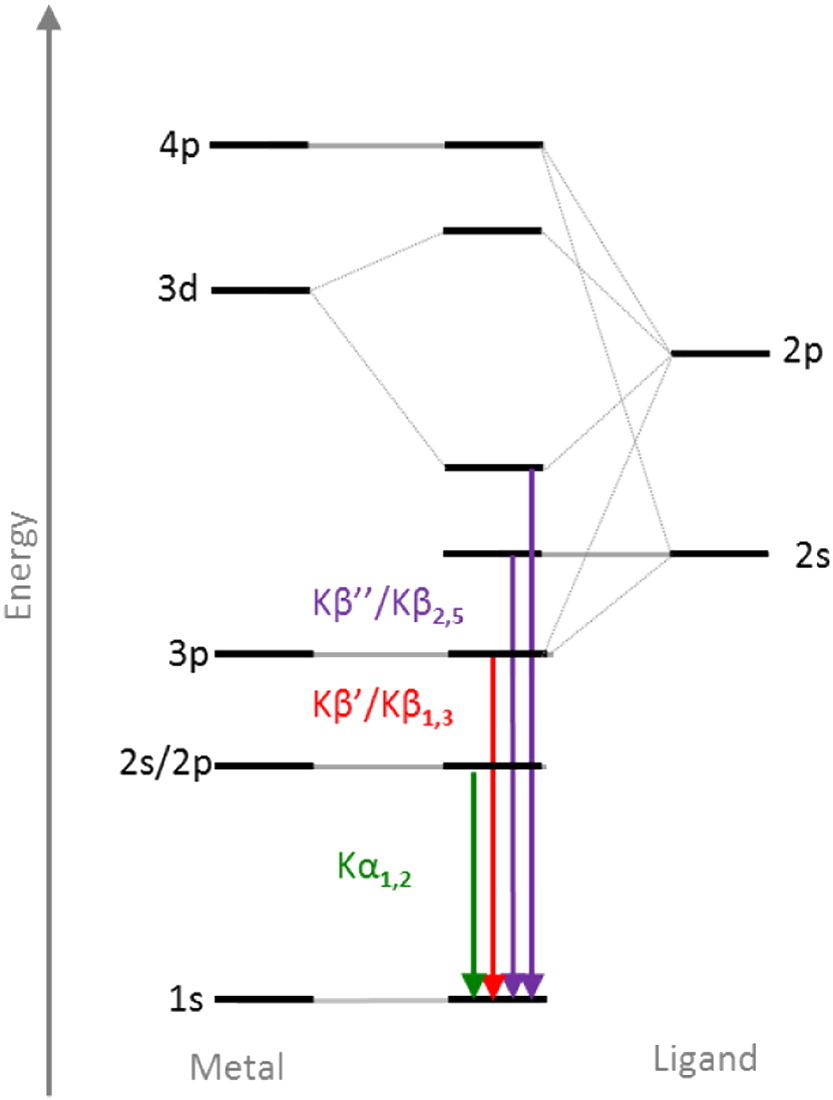
Fig. 2: Energy level diagram K-lines

In these early studies, the authors utilized the electron beam of an X-ray tube to excite core electrons and obtain the $K_{\beta}$-line spectra of sulfur and other elements. Three years later, Coster and Druyvesteyn performed the first experiments using photon excitation. Their work demonstrated that the electron beams produce artifacts, thus motivating the use of X-ray photons for creating the core hole. Subsequent experiments were carried out with commercial X-ray spectrometers and high-resolution spectrometers.

While these early studies provided fundamental insights into the electronic configuration of small molecules, XES only came into broader use with the availability of high-intensity X-ray beams at synchrotron radiation facilities, which enabled the measurement of (chemically) dilute samples. In addition to the experimental advances, there has been progress in quantum chemical computations, which makes XES an intriguing tool for studying the electronic structure of chemical compounds.

Henry Moseley, a British physicist, was the first to discover a relation between the $K_{\alpha}$-lines and the atomic numbers of the probed elements. This was the birth hour of modern X-ray spectroscopy. Later, these lines could be used in elemental analysis to determine the contents of a sample.

William Lawrence Bragg later found a relation between the energy of a photon and its diffraction within a crystal. The formula he established, $n \lambda = 2d \, \sin(\theta)$, says that an X-ray photon with a specific energy bends at a precisely defined angle within a crystal.

== Equipment ==
=== Analyzers ===
A special monochromator is needed to diffract the radiation produced in X-ray sources. This is because X-rays have a refractive index n ≈ 1. Bragg came up with the equation that describes X-ray/neutron diffraction when those particles pass a crystal lattice.(X-ray diffraction)

For this purpose, "perfect crystals" have been produced in many shapes, depending on the geometry and energy range of the instrument. Although they are called perfect, there are miscuts within the crystal structure, which leads to offsets of the Rowland plane. These offsets can be corrected by turning the crystal while looking at a specific energy (for example: $K_{\alpha2}$-line of copper at 8027.83 eV). When the signal intensity is maximized, the photons diffracted by the crystal hit the detector in the Rowland plane. The instrument's horizontal plane will now have a slight offset, which can be corrected by increasing or decreasing the detector angle.

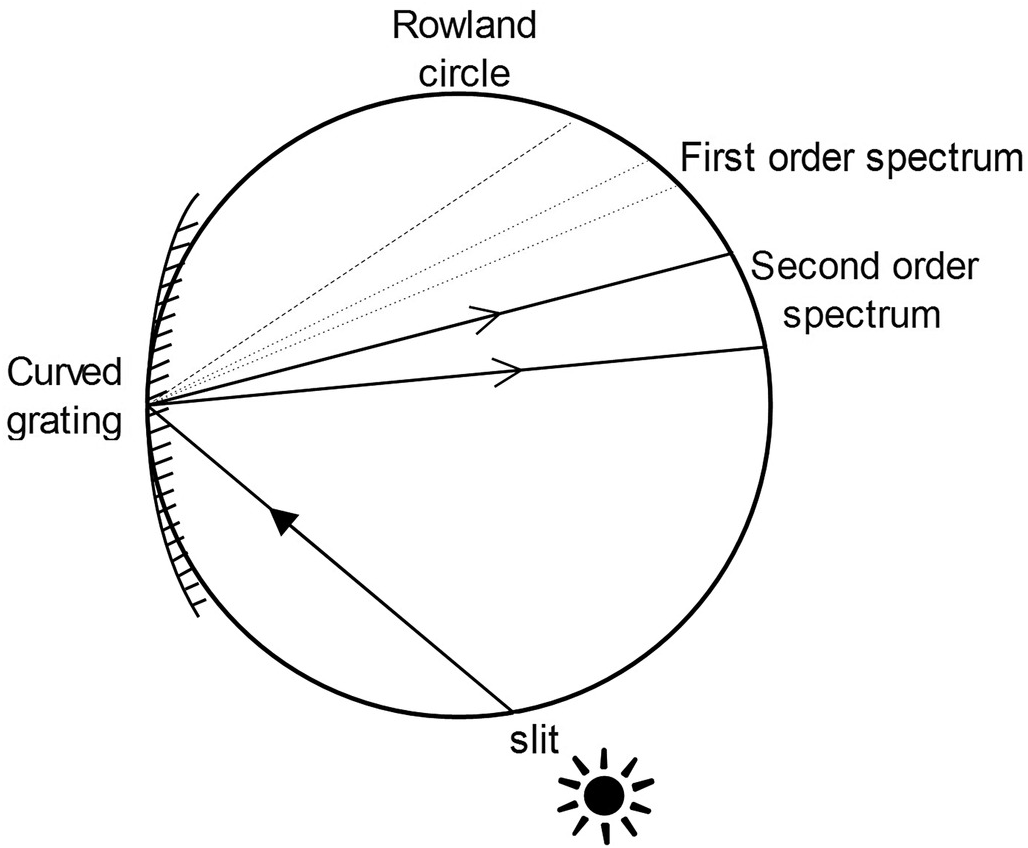
Fig. 3: Rowland circle (Johann geometry) with two orders

In the Von Hamos geometry, a cylindrically bent crystal disperses the radiation along its flat surface's plane and focuses it along its axis of curvature onto a line-like feature.

The spatially distributed signal is recorded with a position-sensitive detector at the crystal's focusing axis, providing the overall spectrum. Alternative wavelength dispersive concepts have been proposed and implemented based on Johansson geometry, having the source positioned inside the Rowland circle. In contrast, an instrument based on Johann geometry has its source placed on the Rowland circle.

=== X-ray sources ===
X-ray sources are produced for many different purposes, yet not every X-ray source can be used for spectroscopy. Commonly used sources for medical applications generally generate very "noisy" source spectra because the used cathode material must not be very pure for these measurements. These lines must be eliminated as much as possible to get a good resolution in all used energy ranges.

For this purpose, normal X-ray tubes with highly pure tungsten, molybdenum, palladium, etc., are made. Except for the copper they are embedded in, they produce a relatively "white" spectrum. Another way of producing X-rays are particle accelerators. They produce X-rays from vectorial changes in their direction through magnetic fields. Whenever a moving charge changes direction, it has to give off radiation with the corresponding energy. In X-ray tubes, this directional change is the electron hitting the metal target (anode). In synchrotrons, the outer magnetic field accelerates the electron into a circular path.

There are many X-ray tubes, and operators must choose accurately depending on what should be measured.

== Modern spectroscopy and the importance of K_{β}-lines in the 21st Century ==
Today, XES is less used for elemental analysis. Still, more and more measurements of $K_{\beta}$-line spectra find importance, as the relation between these lines and the electronic structure of the ionized atom becomes more detailed.

If a 1s-Core-Electron gets excited into the continuum (out of the atoms' energy levels in MO), electrons of higher energy orbitals need to lose energy and "fall" to the 1s-Hole that was created to fulfil Hund's Rule (Fig. 2). Those electron transfers happen with distinct probabilities (see Siegbahn notation).

Scientists noted that after an ionization of a somehow bonded 3d-transition metal-atom, the $K_{\beta}$-lines intensities and energies shift with oxidation state of the metal and with the species of ligand(s). This gave way to a new method of structural analysis:

High-resolution scans of these lines can determine the exact energy level and structural configuration of a chemical compound. If we ignore every transfer that does not affect valence electrons, there are only two major electron transfer mechanisms. If we include the chemical compounds of 3d-transition metals, which can either be high-spin or low-spin, we get 2 mechanisms for each spin configuration.

These two spin configurations determine the general shape of the $K_{\beta1,3}$ and $K_{\beta'}$-mainlines as seen in figure one and two, while the structural configuration of electrons within the compound causes different intensities, broadening, tailing and piloting of the $K_{\beta2,5}$ and $K_{\beta''}$-lines. Although this is quite a lot of information, it must be combined with absorption measurements of the so-called "pre-edge" region. Those measurements are called XANES (X-ray absorption near edge structure).

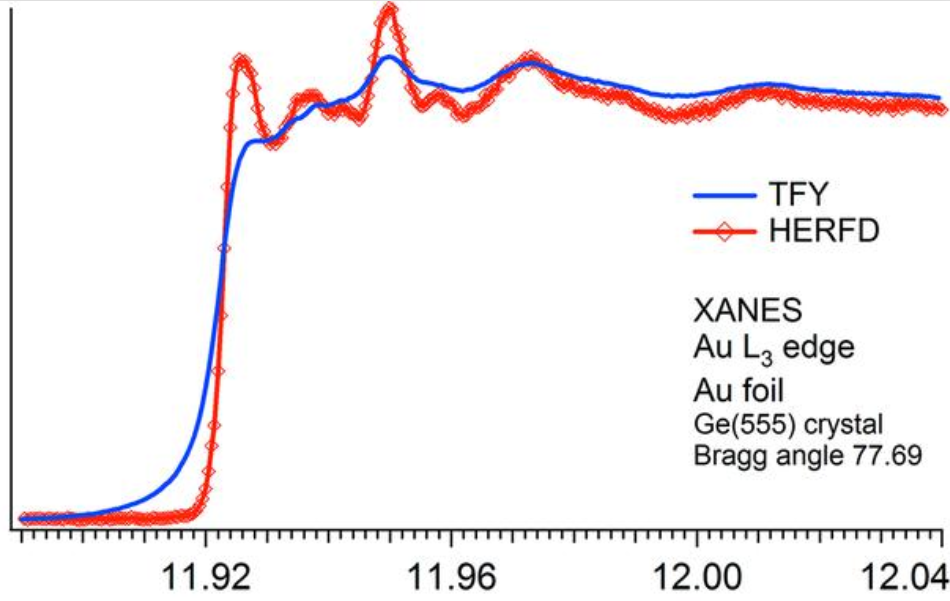
Fig. 4: XAS measurement versus HERFD

In synchrotron facilities, that measurement can be done at the same time. Yet, the experiment setup is quite complex and needs exact and fine-tuned crystal monochromators to diffract the tangential beam coming from the electron storage ring. The method is called HERFD, which stands for High Energy Resolution Fluorescence Detection. The collection method is unique in that, after a collection of all wavelengths coming from "the source" called $I_{0}$, the beam is then shone onto the sample holder with a detector behind it for the XANES part of the measurement. The sample itself starts to emit X-rays, and after those photons have been monochromatized, they are collected, too. Most setups use at least three crystal monochromators or more. The $I_{0}$ is used in absorption measurements as a part of the Beer-Lambert Law in the equation

$$E_\lambda = \log_{10} \left(\frac{I_{0}}{I_{1}}\right) = \varepsilon_{\lambda} \cdot c \cdot d$$

where $I_{1}$ is the intensity of transmitted photons. The received values for the extinction $E_\lambda$ are wavelength-specific, creating a spectrum of absorption. The spectrum produced from the combined data shows a clear advantage in that background radiation is almost completely eliminated while still having a highly resolute view of features on a given absorption edge (Fig. 4).

In the field of development of new catalysts for more efficient energy storage, production and usage in the form of hydrogen fuel cells and new battery materials, the research of the $K_{\beta}$-lines is essential nowadays.

The exact shape of specific oxidation states of metals is mostly known, yet newly produced chemical compounds with the potential to become a reasonable catalyst for electrolysis, for example, are measured daily.

== Soft X-ray emission spectroscopy ==
Soft X-ray emission spectroscopy (SXES) is an experimental technique for determining the electronic structure of materials.

=== Uses ===
X-ray emission spectroscopy (XES) probes the partially occupied density of a material's electronic states. XES is element-specific and site-specific, making it a powerful tool for determining detailed electronic properties of materials.

=== Forms ===
Emission spectroscopy can take the form of either resonant inelastic X-ray emission spectroscopy (RIXS) or non-resonant X-ray emission spectroscopy (NXES). Both spectroscopies involve the photonic promotion of a core level electron and the measurement of the fluorescence that occurs as the electron relaxes into a lower-energy state. The differences between resonant and non-resonant excitation arise from the atom's state before fluorescence occurs.

In resonant excitation, the core electron is promoted to a bound state in the conduction band. Non-resonant excitation occurs when the incoming radiation promotes a core electron to the continuum. When a core hole is created this way, it can be refilled through several decay paths. Because the core hole is refilled from the sample's high-energy free states, the decay and emission processes must be treated separately dipole transitions. This contrasts with RIXS, where the events are coupled and must be treated as a single scattering process.

=== Properties ===
Soft X-rays have different optical properties than visible light, and therefore, experiments must take place in ultra high vacuum, where the photon beam is manipulated using special mirrors and diffraction gratings.

Gratings diffract each energy or wavelength present in the incoming radiation in a different direction. Grating monochromators allow the user to select the specific photon energy they wish to use to excite the sample. Diffraction gratings are also used in the spectrometer to analyze the photon energy of the radiation emitted by the sample.

== See also ==
- X-ray absorption spectroscopy
