= Resonant inelastic X-ray scattering =

Advanced X-ray spectroscopy technique

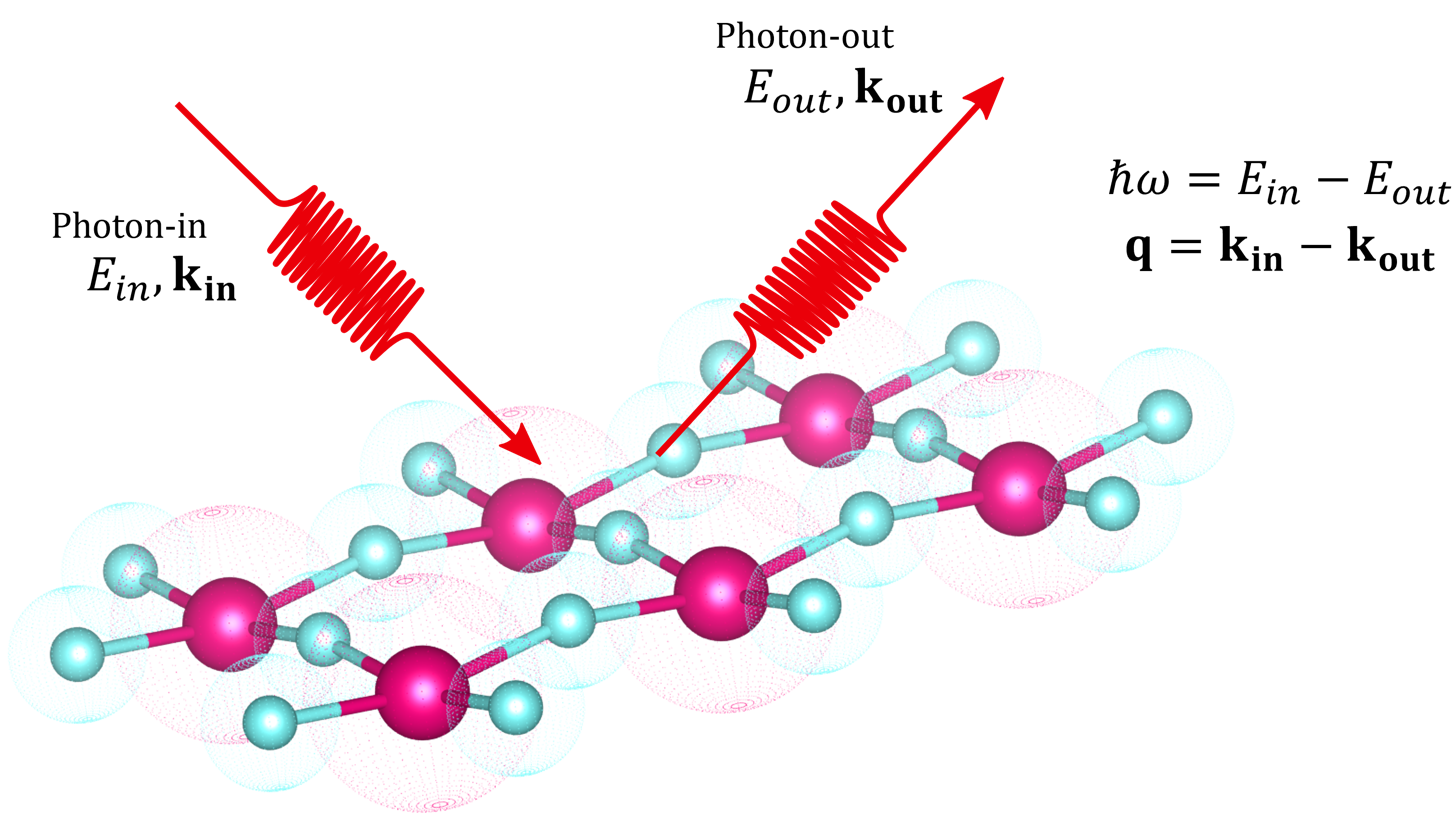
Cartoon of the RIXS experiment. A photon with energy $E_{in}$ and momentum $\textbf{k}_{in}$ impinges on the sample and another photon with energy $E_{out}$ and momentum $\textbf{k}_{out}$ leaves it. The conservation laws of energy and momentum are also highlighted, being ħω and q respectively the energy and momentum transferred to the sample.

Resonant inelastic X-ray scattering (RIXS) is an advanced X-ray spectroscopy technique.

In the last two decades RIXS has been widely exploited to study the electronic, magnetic and structural properties of quantum materials and molecules. It is a resonant X-rays photon-in photon-out energy loss and momentum resolved spectroscopy, capable of measuring the energy and momentum transferred to specific excitations proper of the sample under study.

The use of X-rays guarantees bulk sensitivity, as opposed to electron spectroscopies, and the tuning of the incoming X-rays to a specific absorption edge allows for element and chemical specificity.

Due to the intrinsic inefficiency of the RIXS process, extremely brilliant sources of X-rays are crucial. In addition to that, the possibility to tune the energy of the incoming X-rays is compelling to match a chosen resonance. These two strict conditions make RIXS to be necessarily performed at synchrotrons or nowadays at X-ray free electron lasers (XFELs) and set the advent of third generation synchrotrons (1994, ESRF) as a turning point for the success of the technique.

Exploiting different experimental setups, RIXS can be performed using both soft and hard X-rays, spanning a vast range of absorption edges and thus samples to be studied.

== RIXS process ==
RIXS is a two steps process. First an electron is resonantly excited from a core level, defined by the absorption edge, to an empty state, leaving a core hole. The intermediate state with the core hole has a lifetime of few femtoseconds, then the system radiatively decays into the final state with the filling of the core hole and the emission of another photon. Since the probability of a radiative core hole relaxation is low, the RIXS cross section is very small and a high brilliance X-ray source is needed. Being a second order process, the RIXS cross section is described by the Kramers-Heisenberg formula.

The scattering geometry (incidence and scattering angles) determines the momentum transfer $\vec{q}$. In order to explore the $\vec{q}$ space the spectrometer angle with respect to the incoming beam can be changed, as well as the incident angle to the sample.

The RIXS process can be classified as either direct or indirect. This distinction is useful because the cross-sections for each are quite different. When direct scattering is allowed, it will be the dominant scattering channel, with indirect processes contributing only in higher order. In contrast, for the large class of experiments for which direct scattering is forbidden, RIXS relies exclusively on indirect scattering channels.

=== Direct RIXS ===
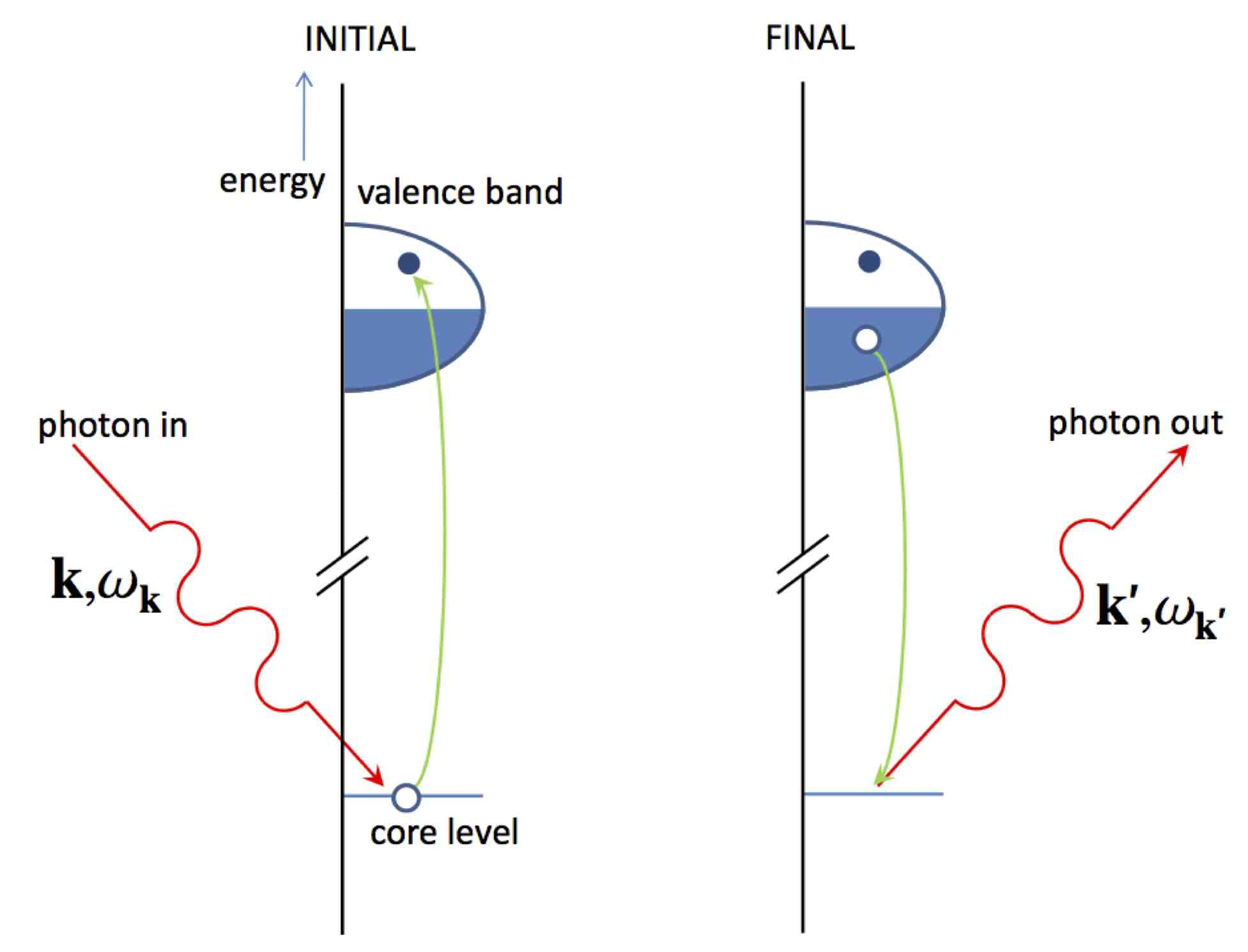
Direct RIXS process. The incoming X-rays excite an electron from a deep-lying core level into the empty valence. The empty core state is subsequently filled by an electron from the occupied states under the emission of an X-ray. This RIXS process creates a valence excitation with momentum $k'-k$ and energy $\hbar\omega - \hbar\omega'$.

In direct RIXS, the incoming photon promotes a core-electron to an empty valence band state. Subsequently, an electron from a different state decays and annihilates the core-hole. The hole in the final state may either be in a core level at lower binding energy than in the intermediate state or in the filled valence shell. Some authors refer to this technique as resonant X-ray emission spectroscopy (RXES). The distinction between RIXS, resonant X-ray Raman and RXES in the literature is not strict.

The net result is a final state with an electron-hole excitation, as an electron was created in an empty valence band state and a hole in a filled shell. If the hole is in the filled valence shell, the electron-hole excitation can propagate through the material, carrying away momentum and energy. Momentum and energy conservation require that these are equal to the momentum and energy loss of the scattered photon.

$\hbar\omega_{\text{transferred}}=\hbar\omega-\hbar\omega'$

$\textbf{q}=\textbf{k}-\textbf{k}'$

For direct RIXS to occur, both photoelectric transitions—the initial one from core to valence state and succeeding one to fill the core hole—must be possible. These transitions can for instance be an initial dipolar transition of 1s → 2p followed by the decay of another electron in the 2p band from 2p → 1s. This happens at the K-edge of oxygen, carbon and silicon. Very efficient sequence often used in 3d transition metals are a 1s → 3d excitation followed by a 2p → 1s decay.

=== Indirect RIXS ===
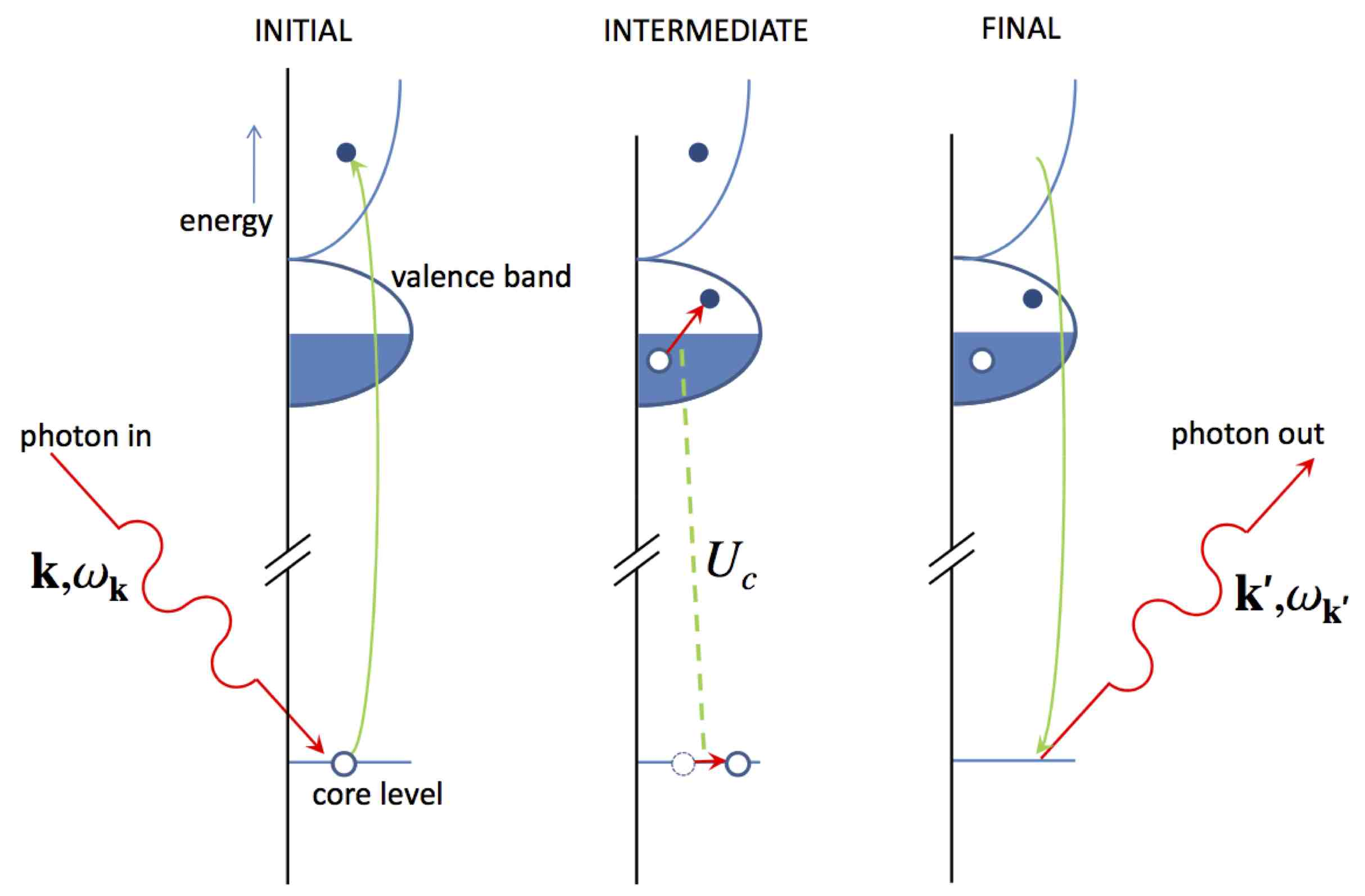
Indirect RIXS process. An electron is excited from a deep-lying core level into the valence shell. Excitations are created through the Coulomb interaction $U_c$ between the core hole (and in some cases the excited electron) and the valence electrons.

Indirect RIXS is slightly more complicated. Here, the incoming photon promotes a core-electron to an itinerant state far above the electronic chemical potential. Subsequently, the electron in this same state decays again, filling the core-hole. Scattering of the X-rays occurs via the core-hole potential that is present in the intermediate state. It shakes up the electronic system, creating excitations to which the X-ray photon loses energy and momentum. The number of electrons in the valence sub-system is constant throughout the process.

== Experimental details ==
In general the natural linewidth of a spectral feature is determined by the life-times of initial and final states. Indeed, as for X-ray absorption and non-resonant X-ray emission spectroscopy the energy resolution is often limited by the relatively short life-time of the final state core-hole. As in RIXS a high energy core-hole is absent in the final state, this leads to intrinsically sharp spectra with energy and momentum resolution determined by the instrumentation.

A convolution of the incident X-ray bandpass, defined by the beamline monochromator, and the bandpass of the RIXS spectrometer for the analysis of the scattered photons energy gives the total (combined) energy resolution. Since RIXS exploits high energy photons in the X-ray range, a very large combined resolving power (10^{3}-10^{5} depending on the goal of the experiment) is needed to detail the different spectral features. Therefore, in the last two decades efforts have been made to improve RIXS spectrometers performances, gaining orders of magnitude in terms of resolving power. State of the art soft X-rays RIXS beamlines in use at the ESRF, at DLS and at NSLS II, have reached approximately 40000 of combined resolving power, leading to a record energy resolution of 25 meV at Cu L_{3} edge.

As for hard X-rays, the optical design is different and requires the use of Bragg reflection crystal analyzers. Thus, the resolving power is mostly determined by the crystal analyzers in use.

=== Soft X-ray spectrometers ===
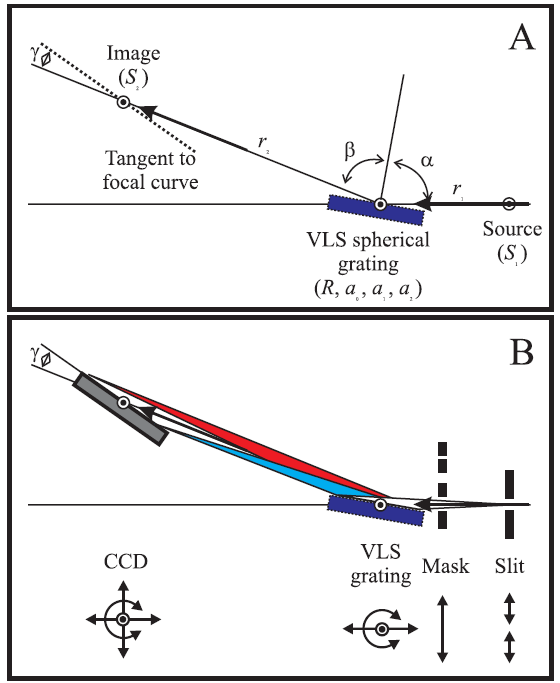
Schematic layout of a varied line spacing (VLS) spherical grating RIXS spectrometer.

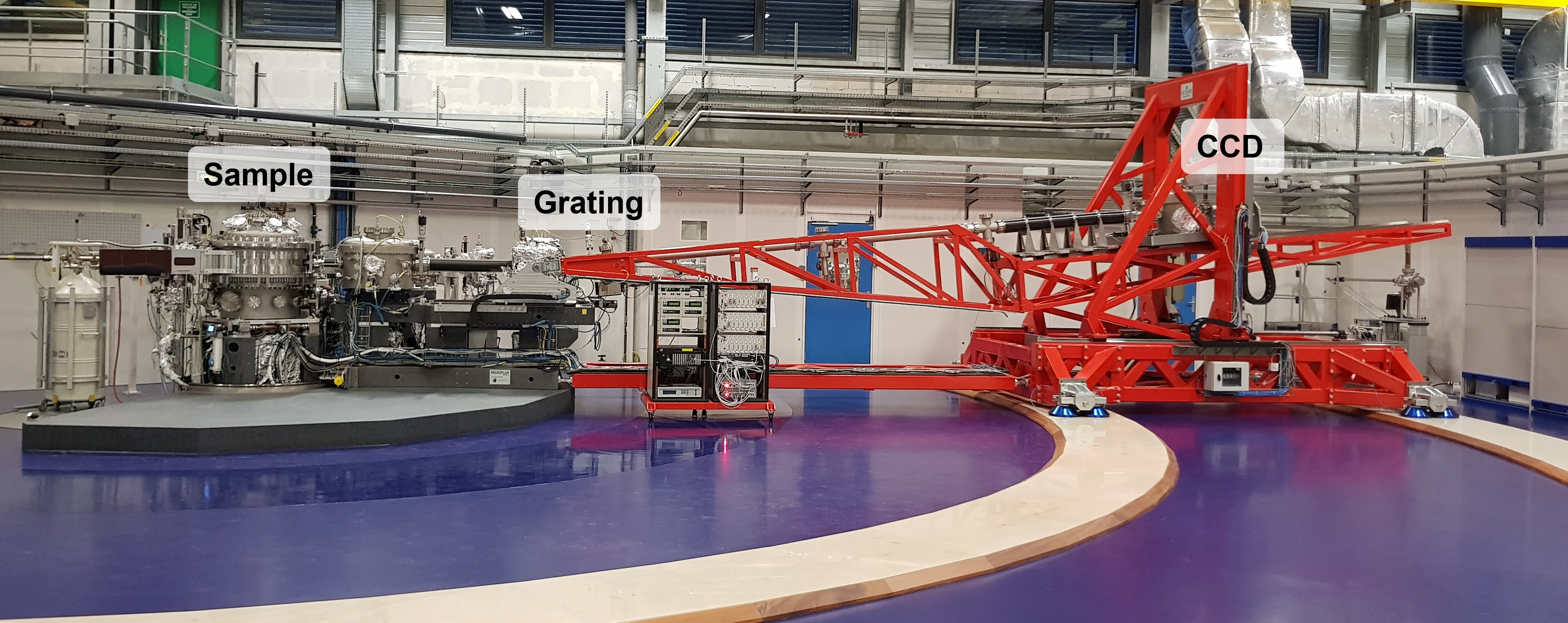
The ESRF ID32 soft X-rays RIXS spectrometer.

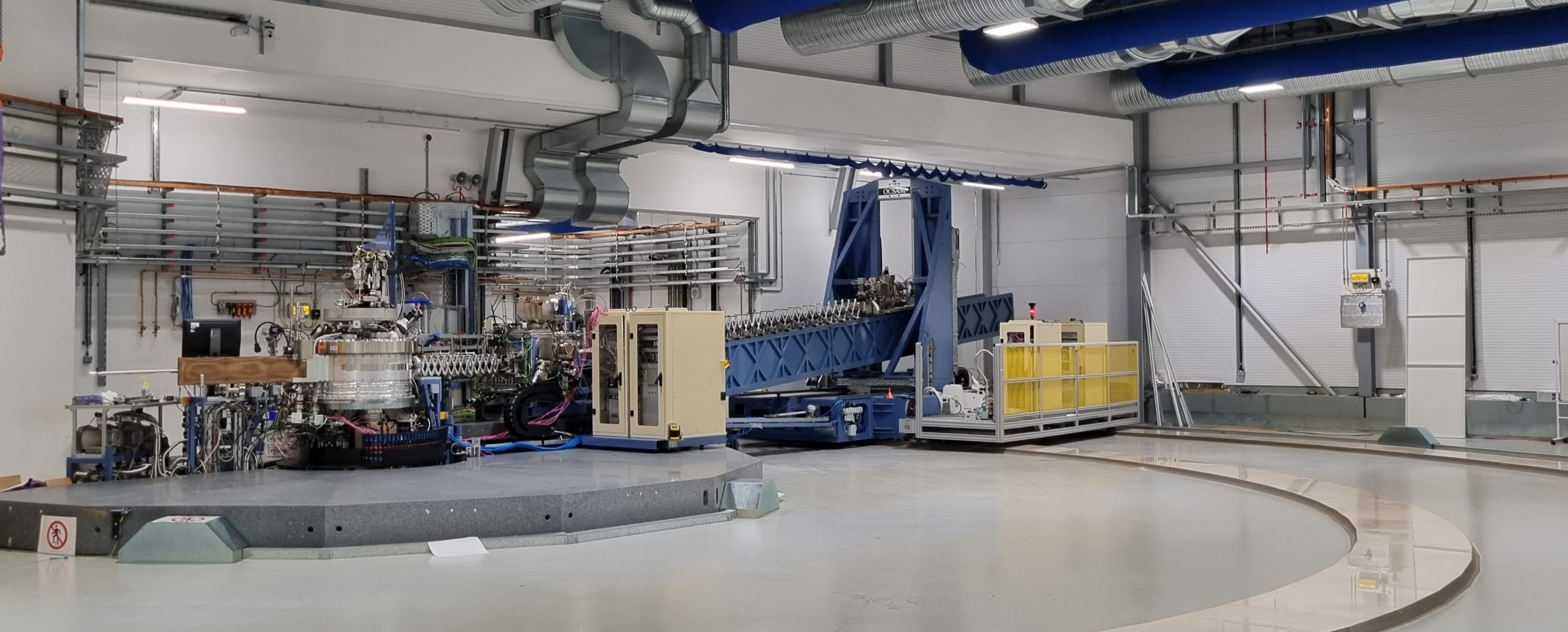
The Diamond Light Source I21 RIXS spectrometer

State of the art soft X-ray RIXS spectrometers are based on grazing incidence diffraction gratings, to disperse the X-rays scattered from the sample, and on position sensitive detectors, mostly CCDs. The two-dimensional image shows a vertical dispersive direction and a non-dispersive one. Integrating along the non-dispersive direction one can obtain a spectrum.

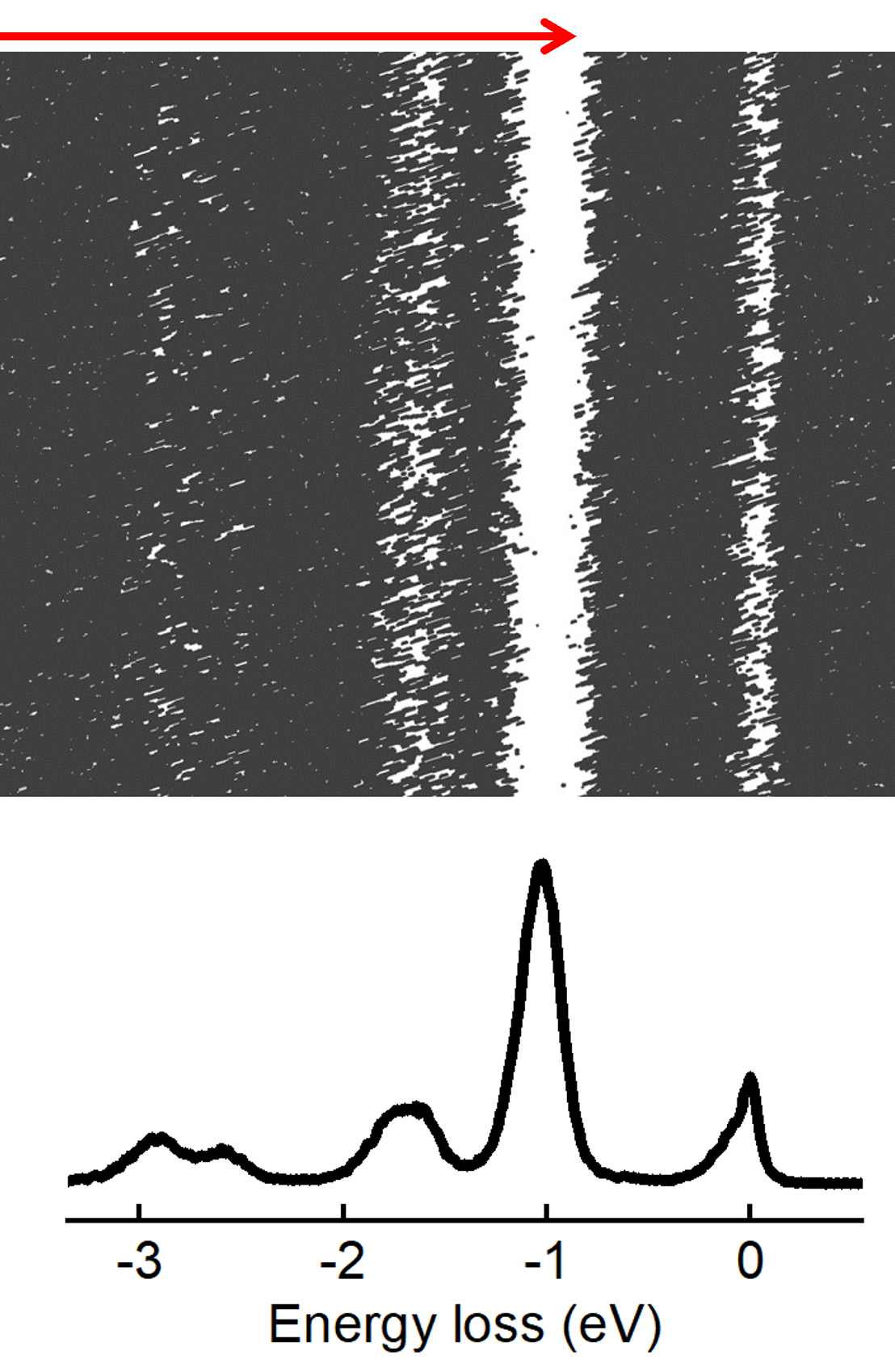
RIXS 2D image on a CCD and the corresponding spectrum in energy loss. The red arrow indicates the dispersive direction.

The whole optical path from the source to the CCD must be kept in UHV to minimize the absorption of X-rays by air. The number of optical elements is typically minimized, which is important for a number of reasons. Indeed, the low reflectivity of optical elements for X-rays reduces the throughput. In addition to that, a non-negligible contribution to the combined resolving power is due to the imperfections on the surface of mirrors and gratings (slope error). Finally, the lower the number of optical elements to be aligned, the better in terms of setup time.

The monochromatized X-rays impinge on the sample with a defined geometry and are scattered and collected by the spectrometer. Collection mirrors are often placed after the sample, the distance (1 cm to 1 m) depends on the optical design. This is useful to increase the acceptance angle of the spectrometer and thus the efficiency.

After the collecting optics X-rays are dispersed by the varied line spacing (VLS) grating that can be either plane or spherical. In the former case, a vertical focusing mirror is added to the optical path to focus the X-rays on the detector, in the latter the grating itself also focuses the dispersed X-rays on the CCD detector. Depending on the absorption edge chosen for the experiment, the respective positions between the grating and the detector, and the incidence angle of the grating can be tuned to optimize the spectrometer in a large energy window, without changing any optical element.

Since the spectral analysis of the scattered X-rays is done through a dispersive grating, longer spectrometers offer higher resolving power. State of the art spectrometers are more than ten meters long, more than five times the dimensions of the pioneering ones. Two examples from ESRF and DLS are in the figures.

=== Hard X-ray spectrometers ===
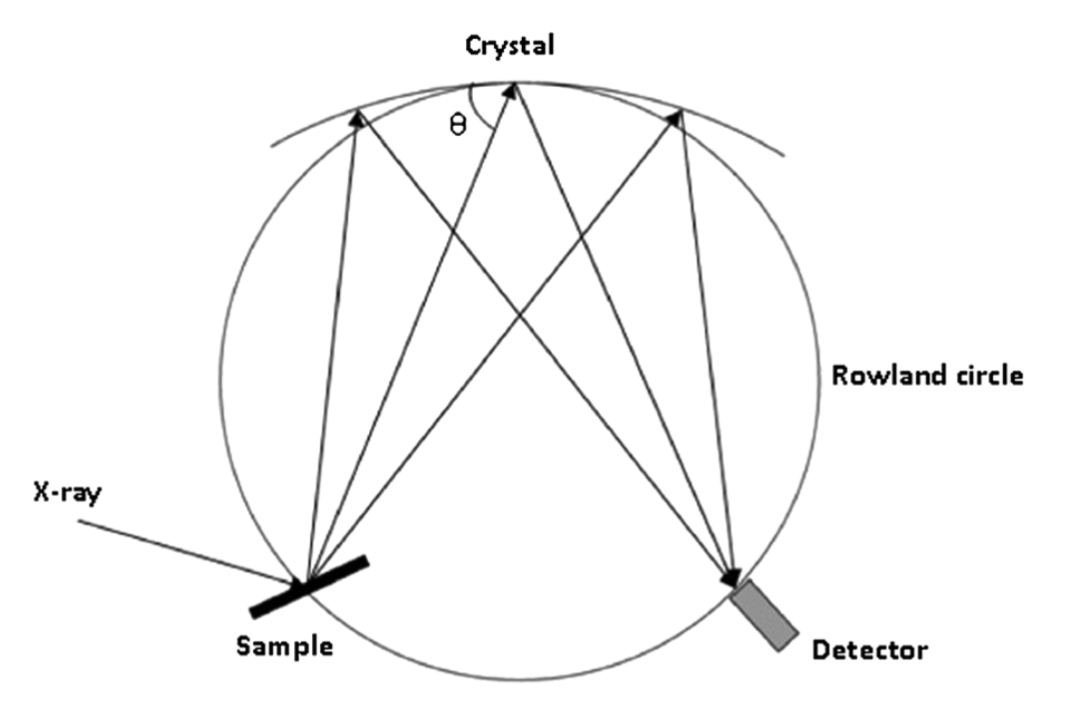
Rowland circle geometry for hard X-rays RIXS experiments.

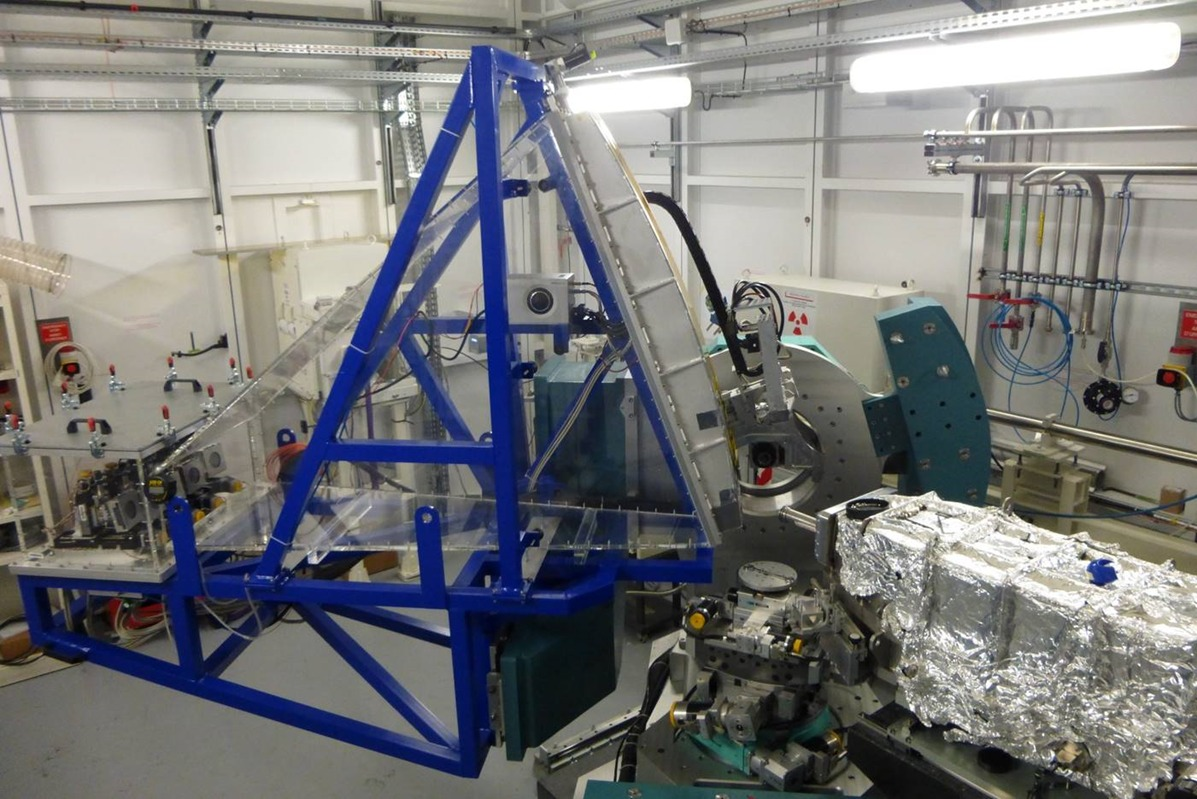
The hard X-rays RIXS spectrometer of the ID20 beamline of the ESRF.

The optical layout for hard X-rays RIXS spectrometers is different. The spectrometers are based on spherical crystal analyzers (typically more than one to increase the solid angle of the spectrometer) exploiting Bragg reflections and on a position sensitive detector, typically in the so called Rowland geometry. This means that the source (X-rays spot on the sample), the analyzers and the detector must sit on the Rowland circle. By scanning the positions of the analyzers and of the detector (the source is fixed for convenience) the Bragg condition is changed and thus the energy of the scattered X-rays can be analyzed. By increasing the radius of the Rowland circle, the energy resolution can be increased, loosing in terms of efficiency. Nevertheless, as opposed to soft X-rays spectrometers, the resolving power of the spectrometer is limited by the crystal analyzers. Thus, increasing too much the dimensions of the spectrometer does not pay off.

Depending on the chosen absorption edge (and thus incidence energy), different crystal analyzers are used both on the monochromator side and on the spectrometer side. Thanks to the high penetration depth of hard X-rays, there is no need of UHV. Therefore, the exchange of optical elements, such as crystal analyzers, is less disruptive than for soft X-rays.

One of the major technical challenges in these RIXS experiments is selecting the monochromator and energy analyzer which produce, at the desired energy, the desired resolution. Some of the feasible crystal monochromator reflections and energy analyzer reflections have been tabulated.

== RIXS properties ==
Compared to other inelastic scattering techniques as INS, IXS, EELS or Raman scattering that present shortcomings, RIXS has a number of unique features: it covers a large scattering phase-space thanks to the high energy photons, it is polarization dependent, element specific, bulk sensitive and requires only small sample volumes enabling studies on thin films as well as diluted solutions. RIXS is a resonant technique because the energy of the incident photon is chosen such that it coincides with, and hence resonates with, one of the atomic X-ray absorption edges of the system. The resonance greatly enhances the valence contribution to the inelastic scattering cross section, sometimes by many orders of magnitude.

Comparing the energy of a neutron, electron or photon with a wavelength of the order of the relevant length scale in a solid - as given by the de Broglie equation considering the interatomic lattice spacing is in the order of Ångströms - it derives from the relativistic energy–momentum relation that an X-ray photon has more energy than a neutron or electron. The scattering phase space (the range of energies and momenta that can be transferred in a scattering event) of X-rays is therefore without equal. In particular, high-energy X-rays carry a momentum that is comparable to the inverse lattice spacing of typical condensed matter systems so that, unlike Raman scattering experiments with visible or infrared light, RIXS can probe the full dispersion of low energy excitations in solids.

RIXS can utilize the polarization of the photon: the nature of the excitations created in the material can be disentangled by a polarization analysis of the incident and scattered photons, which allow one, through the use of various selection rules, to characterize the symmetry and nature of the excitations.

RIXS is element specific: chemical sensitivity arises by tuning to the absorption edges of the different types of elements in a material. RIXS can even differentiate between the same chemical element at sites with different valencies or at inequivalent crystallographic positions as long as the X-ray absorption edges in these cases are distinguishable. In addition, the type of information on the electronic excitations of a system being probed can be varied by tuning to different X-ray edges (e.g., K, L or M) of the same chemical element, where the photon excites core-electrons into different valence orbitals.

RIXS is bulk sensitive: the penetration depth of resonant X-ray photons depends on the material and on the scattering geometry, but typically is of the order of a few micrometers in the hard X-rays regime (for example at transition metal K-edges) and on the order of 0.1 micrometers in the soft X-ray regime (e.g. transition metal L-edges).

RIXS needs only small sample volumes: the photon-matter interaction is relatively strong, compared to for instance to the neutron-matter interaction strength. This makes RIXS feasible on very small volume samples, thin films, surfaces and nano-objects, in addition to bulk single crystal, powder samples or diluted solutions.

== RIXS spectral features ==
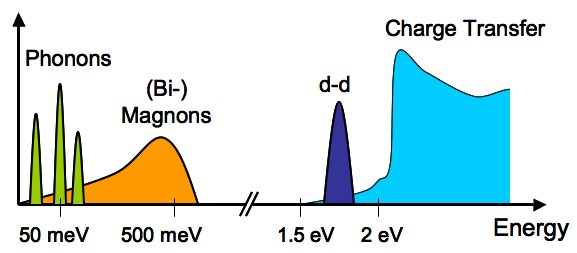
Elementary excitations that can be measured by RIXS. The indicated energy scales are the ones relevant for transition metal oxides.

In principle RIXS can probe a very broad class of intrinsic excitations of the system under study, as long as the excitations are overall charge neutral. This constraint arises from the fact that in RIXS the scattered photons do not add or remove charge from the sample.

Starting from the low energy loss part of the spectrum, RIXS has a purely elastic response, which hosts both a diffused elastic signal, but also any kind of order proper of the system, as charge density waves.

In the low-energy window, the signal is dominated by phonons and vibrational modes that are present in a RIXS spectrum through the electron-phonon coupling. Only a portion of phonons modes that characterize the sample are visible through RIXS.

Electron-hole continuum and excitons in band metals, doped systems and semiconductors are visible through RIXS, thanks to the enhancement of valence charge excitations guaranteed by the resonance character of the technique.

In the charge channel, also plasmons and their dispersion can be measured by RIXS, as well as orbital and crystal field excitations and charge transfer excitations.

Spin excitations are symmetry-allowed in RIXS as well. In particular, RIXS at L and M edges, thanks to the resonant character, also $\Delta S=1$ spin flip excitations (magnons) can be accessed with RIXS, exploiting the spin-orbit coupling of the core level involved in the RIXS process. This makes RIXS as the paramount technique to study magnon dispersions, thanks to the higher cross-section with respect to INS. Besides magnons, RIXS can probe bi-magnons and spinons.

Moreover, it has been theoretically shown that RIXS can probe Bogoliubov quasiparticles in high-temperature superconductors, and shed light on the nature and symmetry of the electron-electron pairing of the superconducting state.

== Pump-probe RIXS with X-ray free electron lasers (XFELs) ==
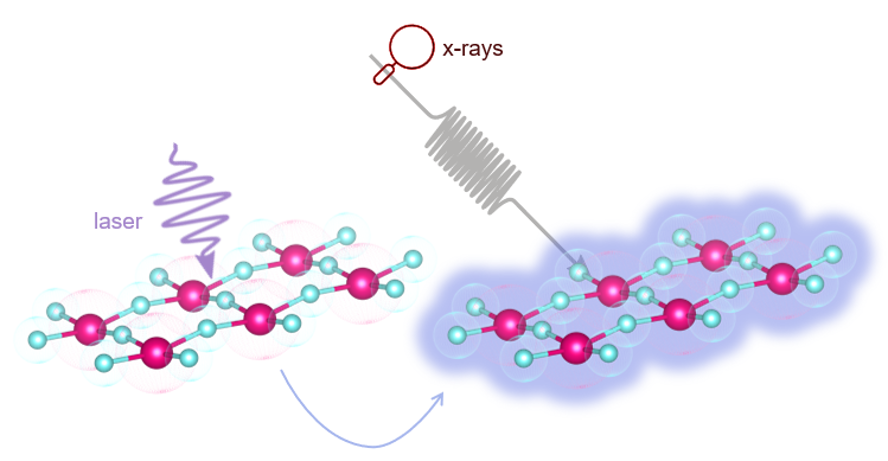
Cartoon of the pump-probe spectroscopy approach. The sample is first prepared in an excited state by a laser pulse and then probed by an X-ray pulse.

With the advent of XFELs, sources that can provide extremely brilliant (more than five orders of magnitude larger than synchrotron sources) and extremely short X-ray pulses, X-ray spectroscopies performed in a pump and probe fashion are nowadays available.

The power of pump-probe spectroscopies lies in the possibility to study how a system evolves after an external stimulus. The most straightforward example is the study of photoactivated biological process, such as the photosynthesis: the sample is illuminated by an optical laser tuned at the proper wavelength and then its evolution is observed taking snapshots as a function of time.

The development of high-resolution RIXS spectrometers at XFELs is opening a new field, exploiting the power of RIXS to study the photo-induced transient states in quantum materials and photoactivated processes in molecules.

== Applications ==
- Intracellular metal speciation,
- Mott insulators
- high-temperature superconductors (e.g., cuprates),
- Iron-based superconductors,
- Semiconductors (e.g. Cu_{2}O)
- Colossal magnetoresistance manganites.
- Metalloproteins (e.g. the oxygen-evolving complex in photosystem II) aqueous myoglobins
- Catalysis
- Water, aqueous solution, aqueous acetic acid, aqueous glycine
- High pressure.

== See also ==
- X-ray scattering techniques
- X-ray Raman scattering (XRS)
- Electron energy loss spectroscopy (EELS)
- Inelastic neutron scattering (INS)
