= Manuel Valadares =

Portuguese nuclear physicist

- Born: Manuel José Nogueira Valadares; 26 February 1904; Lisbon, Portugal
- Died: 31 October 1982 (aged 78); Paris
- Occupations: Atomic and nuclear physicist

Manuel Valadares (1904–1982) was a Portuguese atomic and nuclear physicist, who studied with Marie Curie. He played an important role in the development of atomic and nuclear research at the University of Lisbon before returning to France in 1947 after being dismissed by the Estado Novo government, along with a large number of other university professors and researchers. He was also a pioneer in the use of X-rays for art restoration in Portugal.

== Early studies and Paris ==
Manuel José Nogueira Valadares was born in the Portuguese capital, Lisbon on 26 February 1904. He graduated in physical-chemical sciences at the Faculty of Sciences at the University of Lisbon. After a brief spell as a teacher, he became an assistant at the Portuguese Institute of Oncology. In 1929–1930, with a scholarship from the Portuguese Government, he studied at the Radium Institut Suisse (RIS) in Geneva. Although he learnt a lot from this experience, Valadares nevertheless has some criticisms of the RIS. He found it to be poorly equipped, with no equipment to measure radiation intensity. He also criticized the small space available, that was not enough to protect personnel from radiation. He then spent a month at the Turin anti-cancer institute, before returning to Portugal. He then moved to Paris, where he stayed from November 1930 to 1933 at the Curie Institute. On his first meeting with Marie Curie, he was very shy, fully admitting in correspondence that he was "hesitating and repeating myself horribly". He obtained a doctorate on 11 December 1933, under the supervision of Curie, with a thesis title of Contribution to Spectrography by Crystalline Diffraction of Radiation. Researchers he worked with included Yvette Cauchois, Fernand Holweck and Salomon Rosenblum. In an article he published in 1947 he cited Paul Langevin and Francis Perrin as being major influences during his time in Paris.

== Return to Portugal ==
After returning to Portugal and the University of Lisbon, and still in receipt of scholarships, he devoted himself to investigating nuclear physics and X-ray spectroscopy. In the initial years he was constrained by a lack of suitable equipment due to funding shortages. In 1936 he started several research studies in the field of X-ray spectrography and radioactivity, but only presented the results some years later. In 1936 all civil servants were required by the Estado Novo to sign the following statement: "I declare on my honour that I am part of the order established by the Political Constitution of 1933, with an active rejection of communism and all subversive ideas". Valadares complied with the request reluctantly, one month after being asked.

While in Paris he had collaborated with the Mainini Institute, which was pioneering the use of X-rays to study works of art, particularly in the Louvre museum. In 1937 he was given a scholarship to work with João Couto, director of the National Museum of Ancient Art in Lisbon to establish a laboratory to investigate works of art through the use of radiographic equipment.

In 1940–1941, Valadares went on a scholarship to the Alessandro Volta Institute in Pavia, Italy, choosing that institution because it was in the process of assembling a particle accelerator. He was also able to use its Moll microphotometer to study the intensity of spectral streaks of lead. From Pavia, Valadares moved to the Physics Laboratory of the Instituto di Sanitá Pubblica of Rome, where he used a spectrograph specially built for him to study the crystalline diffraction of radiation. He then returned to Portugal, where he played an important role in the beginning of atomic and nuclear research at the Physics Laboratory of the Faculty of Sciences of the University of Lisbon, creating, with others, the Centre for Physics Studies (Centro de Estudos de Física) where he guided researchers in nuclear physics and spectrometry.

Valadares was awarded a doctorate by the University of Lisbon in 1942. In the same year he was offered a full professorship by the University of Porto but turned the offer down because he wanted to concentrate on research rather than teaching. This was despite his exceptional teaching skills, a fact that was highlighted when he was awarded an honorary degree at the University of Lisbon in 1981. Meanwhile, he continued to prepare a student manual on atomic physics, which was published in 1947. He was co-founder in 1943 of the journal Portugaliae Physica. It was intended, through this magazine, both to disseminate the research work done in Portugal, and to also publish foreign scientists. He also contributed in 1946 to the foundation of the magazine Gazeta de Física, aimed at Portuguese physicists and students, publishing several articles there. The first editor of this was Lidia Salgueiro, whose PhD thesis he had supervised.

== Dismissal and return to Paris ==
In June 1947, Valadares was dismissed by the Estado Novo government, along with a large number of other university professors and researchers from the universities of Lisbon, Porto and Coimbra. In November of that year he returned to Paris, at the invitation of Irène Joliot-Curie, where he held several academic positions. Working for the French National Centre for Scientific Research (CNRS), he rose to the position of director of the Centre de Spéctrométrie Nucléaire et de Spéctrométrie de Masse, occupying the post until 1968. In 1969 he was nominated honorary director of the centre. During his time in France, he continued to collaborate with those who remained in Portugal, hoping that his work in Lisbon would not die. Researchers at the Centre for Physics Studies sometimes went to Paris to discuss ongoing work with him and seek his suggestions for continuing their research.

The Portuguese vonsul in Paris refused to renew the passports of Valadares, his wife and son in 1966, stating that this was on orders from Lisbon. He would only renew their passports for travel to Portugal. Consequently, Valadares requested French naturalization, receiving the full support of his employers.

Manuel Valadares died on 31 October 1982.

== Awards and honours ==
- In 1939 he received the Artur Malheiros Award from the Lisbon Academy of Sciences for his work Analysis, by X-ray spectrography, of natural and provoked nuclear transmutations.
- In France, he was awarded the Prix La Caze by the French Academy of Sciences in 1966, in recognition of his research in alpha ray spectrometry.
- He was elected an honorary member of the Portuguese Physics Society in 1978.
- In 1979, he was made an Officer of the Military Order of Saint James of the Sword (Portuguese: Ordem Militar de Sant'Iago da Espada), for services rendered to Portugal.
- In 1981 he was awarded an Honorary Degree by the University of Lisbon.
- In 1991, a street in Lisbon was named after him, as Rua Prof. Manuel Valadares.

== Publications ==
Valadares published, often in collaboration with his colleagues or students, more than 70 articles, mostly related to his research in atomic and nuclear physics. He supported many researchers and guided many research studies by PhD students. His publications included:

- Figures de distribution du dépôt actif sur les électrodes (with S. Rosenblum), C. R. Acad. Sc. Paris, 192, (1931), 939.
- Sur la structure fine des rayons alpha du ThC (with S. Rosenblum), C. R Acad. Sc. Paris, 194 (1932), 967.
- Spectrographie, par diffraction cristalline, des rayons gamma et X de la famille du Radium, C. R. Acad. Sc Paris 197 (1933) 144
- Contribution & la spectrographie, par diffraction cristalline, du rayonnement gamma, Thèse, Paris. 1933; Annales de Physique, 2 (1934) 197
- Contributo allo studio degli spettri γ e X molli dei prodotti di disintegrazione del radon, Rend, R. Accad d'Italia, 2 (1940), 351; e Rend. Ist. Sanità Pub., 3 (1941), 953
- La loi photoélectrique d’Einstein et le phénomène de conversion interne, Portugal Phys. 1 (1943), 35
- Influence de latension d'excitation sur les satellites des raies L de l'or, (with F. Mendes), C. R. Acad. Sc. Paris, 227 (1948), 1088
- Structure fine du spectre magnétique alpha du thorium X (with S. Rosenblum, M. Perey and J. Vial), C. R. Acad. de. Paris, 229 (1949), 1009
- Structure fine du spectre magnétique alpha du plutonium 239 (with S. Rosenblum and B. Goldschmidt), C. R. Acad. Sc. Paris, 230 (1950) 638
- Sur l'influence du moment magnétique nucléaire sur la largeur des raies dans les spectres de rayons X (with M. Frilley and B. G. Gokhale), C. R. Acad. Sc. Paris 233 (1951) 1183
- Sur la largeur propre des raies d'électrons de conversion, J. de Phys. et Rad. 16 (I955), 542
- Sur l'existence de bandes satellites dans les spectres d'électrons de conversion interne (with R. J. Walen and Ch. Briançon), C. R. Acad. Sc. Paris, 263 (1966), 313
- Effets du recul alpha en conversion interne, Journal de Physique, 29 CI (1968), 103
- Internal conversion electrons: Energy shift and nuclear half-life in ionized atoms-multiple deep vacancy production through second order effects (with R. J. Walen and Ch. Briançon), International Conference on Inner Shell Ionization Phenomena, Atlanta, Georgia (1972), 1906.
- Absorção da radiação beta na passagem através lâminas, metálicas (contribuição para beta-terapia superficial), Arquivo de Patologia, 2 (1930), 238
- Colheita e preparação do radão (instalação e técnica), Arquivo de Patologia, 2, (1930), 247
- Mecanismo de emissão da radiação gama, Revista de Química Pura e Aplicada, 9 (1934), 3 “Madame Curie”, Técnica, n.º 64 (1935), 51, e Gazeta de Física 1. (1948) 272
- Transmutation des éléments par des particules accélérées artificiellement, Ed. Hermann et Cie, Paris (1935)
- Laboratório para o exame de obras de arte, Boletim dos Museus Nacionais de Arte Antiga, 1 (1939), 32
- Estudo comparativo, ao Raio X, da obra dos Cranach (with O. Trigo de Sousa), Boletim dos Museus Nacionais de Arte Antiga, 8 (1943), 187
- Elementos de Física Atómica, Sá da Costa Ed., Lisboa (1947)
- A importância da energia nuclear para o nosso país, Seara Nova, 1331-6 (1957), 77

For a complete list see
