= Lidia Salgueiro =

Portuguese nuclear physicist

- Lídia Salgueiro in 1951
- Born: Lídia Coelho Salgueiro; 31 December 1917; Lisbon, Portugal
- Died: 24 July 2009 (aged 91); Lisbon
- Occupations: Atomic and nuclear physicist

Lidia Salgueiro (1917-2009) was a Portuguese atomic and nuclear physicist. She taught at the University of Lisbon for over 30 years, carried out research, and published widely, including journal articles, textbooks, articles on the history of physics in Portugal, and philatelic publications on stamps and physics. She was the first female Associate Fellow of the Lisbon Academy of Sciences.

== Early life ==
Lídia Coelho Salgueiro was born in the Portuguese capital, Lisbon, on 31 December 1917. She was the daughter of João F. da Fonseca da Rocha Salgueiro and Maria Angelica Pina Coelho Salgueiro. She had one sister. Her father died at the age of 35, when she was only 5. Although he came from a relatively wealthy family, he had fallen out with his mother who wanted him to pursue a law career rather than study medicine. This left his wife in a condition of some poverty on his death. Salgueiro started high school in Lisbon but, two years later, her family moved to Viseu, where she completed high school. By her third year at high school she was already assisting with the teaching, to contribute to the family finances. She then went to the University of Coimbra but later requested a transfer to the University of Lisbon and graduated in 1941 with distinction in Physics and Chemistry from the Faculty of Sciences of the University of Lisbon.

== University of Lisbon ==
Staying at the university as a teaching assistant, she worked at the Centre for Physics Studies in the Faculty of Sciences, an institution that until 1933 had only concentrated on teaching but, during her time, pioneered much scientific research. With the Centre facing budgetary constraints she proved adept at adapting old laboratory equipment for use in experiments in areas such as nuclear physics and X-ray spectrography. Using this equipment for her studies on experimental physics and nuclear physics, she became, in 1945, the second woman to be awarded a doctorate in physical sciences by the University of Lisbon, with a thesis entitled Gamma Spectrum of Long-life Derivatives of Radon, immediately being hired by the Department of Physics as an assistant professor. She was a member of the board of referees for the scientific journal Portugaliae Physica and, in 1946, was one of the founders and the first editor of the journal Gazeta de Física, which was aimed at physics teachers.

From 1942 to 1972 Salgueiro taught several courses, including in optics, general physics, atomic physics, quantum mechanics, spectroscopy of X-rays, and medical physics. Her work was interrupted in 1947 by a decision of Portugal's Estado Novo regime to remove twenty-one professors from Portuguese universities, three of them from the Department of Physics. These included her PhD supervisor, Manuel Valadares, who moved to Paris following an invitation from Irène Joliot-Curie. Despite a complete absence of research funds, Salgueiro continued X-ray and radioactivity research. Over the years, she supervised several doctoral candidates, the first, in 1954, being José Gomes Ferreira, who would become her husband, colleague and co-author. In 1956 to 1957, Salgueiro and her husband worked as interns at the Department of Natural Philosophy of the University of Edinburgh, under the direction of Norman Feather, the English nuclear physicist.

Salgueiro had to wait until 1974 to become a full professor, after the overthrow of the Estado Novo by the Carnation Revolution. In 1976 she founded the Atomic Physics Centre of the University of Lisbon. On her own, with her husband and with Manuel Valadares, who had obtained his Doctorate under the supervision of Marie Curie, she produced many publications, ranging from journal articles to student textbooks. She retired from the university in 1978 for health reasons but continued to carry out research. In 1981 she was the first woman to be elected as a Corresponding Member of the Lisbon Academy of Sciences, an organization founded in 1779.

== Philately and science ==
Manuel Valadares inspired Salgueiro to make a thematic collection of postage stamps in the area of physics. In addition to stamps she collected First-Day Covers, and philatelic rarities. She produced several publications on the topic, doing all of her own photography.

Lídia Salgueiro died on 24 July 2009 at the age of 91.

== Selected publications ==
This is a list of some of Salgueiro's publications. In many cases they were co-authored but she was the lead author.

Textbooks

- Medical Physics, University of Lisbon (1969)
- Introduction to Atomic and Nuclear Physics (Vols I & 2), Escolar Editora, Lisbon (1970 & 1975)
- Elements of Physics for Biology Students, Escolar Editora (1972 & 1973)
- Introduction to Biophysics, Fundação Calouste Gulbenkian, Lisbon (1991)

Philately

The following were published by the Memórias da Academia de Ciências de Lisboa (Memories of the Lisbon Science Academy)

- Physics through Philately
- Atomic Physics through postage stamps (XXV, 1984)
- Theories of light (XXXII, 1992/3)
- The atom and radiation (XXXIII, 1993-4)
- Visible and invisible radiation (XXXIV, 1993-4)
- Commemoration of the centenary of Hertz's death (XXXIV, 1993/4)
- Röntgen and the first years after the discovery of radioactivity (XXXVI; 1996-7)
- Contribution of philately to the history of science(XLI, 1998-2001)

History

- Life and Work of Manuel Valadares, Gazeta de Física 6 (1) (Feb. 1978).
- History of the atomic physics group of the University of Lisbon. Journal of X-Ray Spectrometry. 35, 271 (2006).

Technical papers

- Micro-radiographs by reflection and by transmission, Gazeta de Física 2 (2) (Jan. 1950).
- Physical fundamentals of electron microscopy, Med. Contemp. 74, 3 (1956).
- Evolution of radioactivity until the discovery of nuclear fission, Science 3 (1964).
- Fundamentals of X radiation emission and absorption processes”, Gazeta de Física 5 (5) (Mar. 1972).
