= João Couto =

Director of the National Museum of Ancient Art in Lisbon, Portugal (1938–62)

- Born: João Rodrigues da Silva Couto; 1892; Coimbra, Portugal
- Died: 1968 (aged 75–76); Lisbon, Portugal
- Occupation: Museum director
- Years active: 40

João Couto (1892 - 1968) was an art historian, specialising in Portuguese painting, who was director of the National Museum of Ancient Art (MNAA) in Lisbon, Portugal.

== Early training ==
João Rodrigues da Silva Couto was born in Coimbra, in 1892. He studied Law between 1908 and 1913, receiving a Bachelor of Laws from the University of Coimbra, and a degree in Historical-Geographical Sciences in 1914 and 1915 at the Faculty of Letters of the same university, studying under António Garcia Ribeiro de Vasconcelos and, even at that early stage, organising tours for students to visit the artistic heritage of the Coimbra area. In 1914, he started internships at the National Gallery and at the Victoria and Albert Museum in London, but had to return to Portugal early due to the start of World War I. After graduation he studied at a teacher training college, preparing a thesis on Education through Art, and then taught at that school while simultaneously studying conservation and museum curation at the Machado de Castro National Museum in Coimbra. There he studied under António Augusto Gonçalves, who had played an important role in the restoration of the Old Cathedral of Coimbra.

== Move to Lisbon ==
In 1924, Couto moved to Lisbon, where he taught at the Liceu Pedro Nunes, an important high school with many distinguished alumni. The transfer enabled him to take up an invitation by the director of the MNAA, José de Figueiredo, to work there on an unpaid part-time basis, which he did between 1924 and 1928. He reconciled these two occupations by establishing a close relationship between his students and the museum. This led to his becoming a curator at the MNAA, where he created the first School Extension Service, which organised lectures, visits, courses and conferences to inform Lisbon's schools about the museum.

In 1930 Couto was appointed curator at the new Palácio dos Condes de Castro Guimarães museum in Cascais but returned to the MNAA in 1932, where, after the death of Figueiredo in 1938, he became the director, a position he was to occupy until 1962. The museum, also known as the Janelas Verdes (Green windows) museum, after the palace that hosts it, had been established in 1884 to display, in particular, items from monasteries, churches and convents that had been seized after the dissolution of the monasteries in Portugal in 1834. Couto became known as a specialist in Portuguese painting and jewellery, as well as for his work on education through museums, on restoration and conservation, and on research on the topic of the history of art, as well as for his significant contribution to the professional training of museum staff. He published on a wide variety of topics.

Between 1932 and 1938 Couto developed the museum's Laboratory of Scientific Research for the Examination of Works of Art. The laboratory attached particular importance to the use of radiography to analyse works of art, and worked with specialized collaborators such as Luis Xavier da Costa and Manuel Valadares, with whom Couto published several papers on the restoration of items held by MNAA.

== Director of MNAA ==
On assuming the direction of the MNAA, Couto began to remodel and expand the museum. A particular innovation was the construction of a space for temporary exhibitions, which allowed the museum to regularly organize exhibitions of pieces normally held in other museums as well as didactic exhibitions using items from its own store rooms. An auditorium for conferences and film shows was also added. The improvements made allowed the museum to play an important role in the Portuguese World Exhibition, held in Lisbon in 1940, when it hosted two exhibitions. In 1953, Couto initiated the Centro Infantil (Children's Centre) at the museum, which influenced the creation of similar educational services at other museums in Portugal, including those that were not devoted to the Arts. In the same year he also established the Centre for the Study of Art and Museology. He would later inspire the founding of the Associação Portuguesa de Museologia (Portuguese Museology Association). Between 1939 and his death in 1968 Couto published the Boletim dos Museu Nacional de Arte Antiga (Bulletin of the National Museum of Ancient Art). He also contributed to the monthly bulletin of the Mocidade Portuguesa Feminina between 1939 and 1947. This was a compulsory organization for girls established by the right-wing Estado Novo government.

João Rodrigues da Silva Couto died in Lisbon in 1968.

== Awards and honours ==
- Commander of the Military Order of Saint James of the Sword (Portuguese: Ordem Militar de Sant'Iago da Espada)
- Commander of the Order of Prince Henry (Portuguese: Ordem do Infante Dom Henrique)
- Grand Officer of the Order of Public Instruction, Portugal
