= Electron orbital imaging =

Electron orbital imaging is an X-ray synchrotron technique used to produce images of electron (or hole) orbitals in real space. It utilizes the technique of X-ray Raman scattering (XRS), also known as Non-resonant Inelastic X-Ray Scattering (NIXS) to inelastically scatter electrons off a single crystal. It is an element specific spectroscopic technique for studying the valence electrons of transition metals.

== Background ==
Pictures of electron's wavefunctions are commonplace in most quantum mechanics textbooks. However, the images shown of these orbital shapes of these electrons are entirely mathematical constructs. As a purely experimental technique electron orbital imaging has the ability to solve some problems in condensed matter physics without the use of complementary theoretical approaches. Theoretical approaches, while indispensable, invariably rely on several underlying assumptions, which vary depending on the approach used. The motivation for developing orbital imaging stemmed from the desire to omit the complex theoretical calculations to model experimental spectra; and instead simply "see" the relevant occupied and unoccupied electron orbitals.

== Experimental setup ==
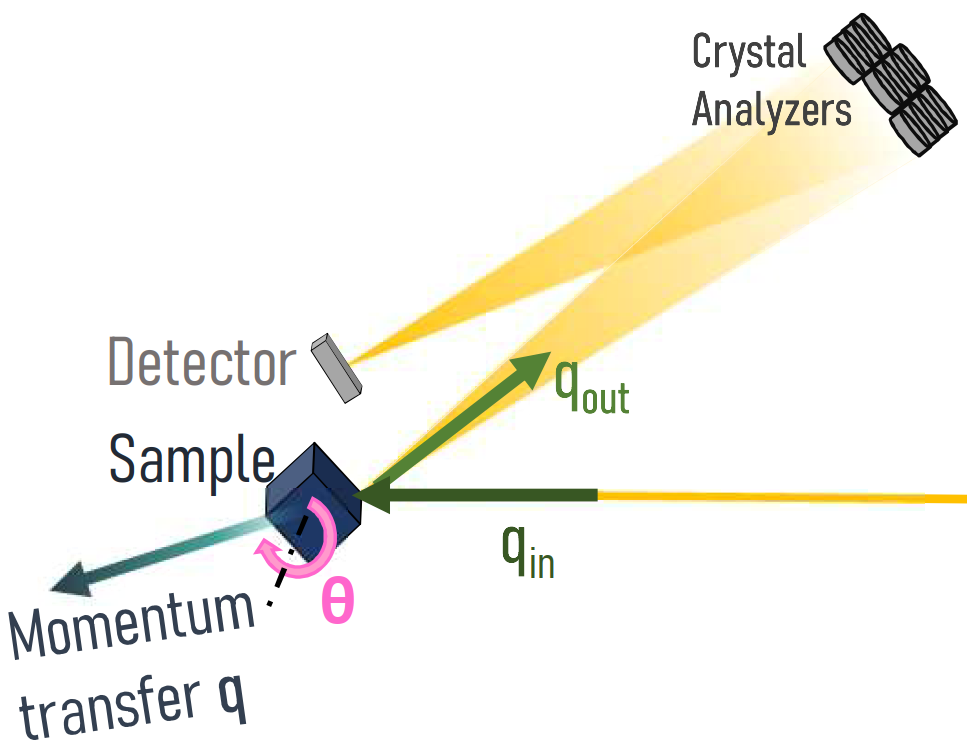
Fig 1.The experimental setup utilizes the difference in the momentum vector of an incident photon and an outgoing photon. The vector difference between these is q, which is the direction that the electron holes are measured in (relative to the orientation of the single crystal sample). The crystal analyzers act to filter out all but a single photon energy from the large range of incident energies that impinge on them.

The non-resonant inelastic x-ray scattering cross section is orders of magnitude smaller than that of photoelectric absorption. Therefore, high-brilliance synchrotron beamlines with efficient spectrometers that are able to span a large solid angle of detection are required. XRS spectrometers are usually based on spherically curved analyzer crystals that act as focusing monochromator after the sample. The energy resolution is on the order of 1 eV for photon energies on the order of 10 keV.

Briefly put, the technique measures the density of electron holes the valence band in the direction of the momentum transfer vector q (Fig. 1), which is defined as the difference in momentum between the incoming q_{in} and outgoing q_{out} photons. The sample is rotated between subsequent measurement (by some angle θ) such that the momentum transfer vector traverses a plane in the crystal. Because holes are simply the inverse of the electron occupation, the occupied (electrons) and unoccupied (holes) orbitals in a given plane can be imaged. In practice, photons ~10keV are used in order to achieve a sufficiently large q (needed to access dipole forbidden transitions, see below Theoretical Basis). The scattered photons are detected at a constant energy, while the incident photon energy is swept above that over a range corresponding to the binding energy of the relevant excitation. For example, if the energy of the photons detected is 10keV, and the nickel 3s (binding energy of 111eV) excitation is of interest, then the incident photons are swept in a range around 10.111keV. In this manner the energy transferred to the sample is measured. The intensity of a core level electron excitation (such as 3s→3d) is integrated for various directions of the momentum transfer vector q relative to the crystal being measured. An s orbital is the most convenient to utilize because it is spherical, and therefore the technique is sensitive only to the shape of the final wavefunction. As such, the integrated intensity of the resulting spectrum is proportional to the hole density in direction of q.

== Theoretical basis ==
The technique is hinged on its ability to access dipole forbidden electronic transitions.

The double differential cross section for a NIXS measurement is given by:

${\displaystyle {d^{2}\sigma \over d\Omega d\omega}=\left({d\sigma \over d\Omega }\right)_{\rm {Th}}\times S(\mathbf{q},\omega)}$

where (dσ/dΩ)_{Th} is the Thomson scattering cross-section (representing the elastic scattering of electromagnetic waves off electrons) and S(q,ω) is the dynamic structure factor, which contains the physics of the material being measured, and is given by:

$S(\mathbf{q},\omega)= \sum _{{f}}|{\mathrm \langle{f} |{e}}^{{-i\mathbf{q}\cdot \mathbf{r}}}|i\rangle|^2 \delta(E_i+E_f+\hbar \omega)$

where q = k_{f} - k_{i} is the momentum transfer and the delta function δ conserves energy: ω is the photon energy loss and E_{i} & E_{f} are the initial and final states of the system, respectively. If q is small then the Taylor expansion of the transition matrix e^{iq·r} implies that only the first (dipole) term in the expansion is important. Orbital imaging relies of the fact that as the momentum transfer increases (~4 to 15 Å^{−1}) further terms in the expansion of the transition matrix become relevant, which allows the experimenter to observe higher multipole transitions (quadrupole, octupole, etc.).

== Applications ==
Electron orbital imaging has applications in solid state physics wherein the primary goal is to understand the observed bulk properties of a given material—whether electronic or magnetic—from the atomic perspective of the constituent electrons. In many materials it is the case is that there is a delicate balance of competing interactions that together stabilize a particular orbital state, which in turn determines the physical properties. Electron Orbital Imaging allows scientists to directly image the valence electron orbitals in real space. This has the advantage of bypassing theoretical modelling of experimental spectra (which is often an intractable problem), and observing the relevant orbitals directly.

The first application of the technique was published in 2019 and showed the 3d orbitals (specifically the holes, which are the inverse of the electrons) of Nickel(II) oxide. The shape of the e_{g} orbitals were imaged in real space through a cross-sectional cut of a single crystal of NiO.

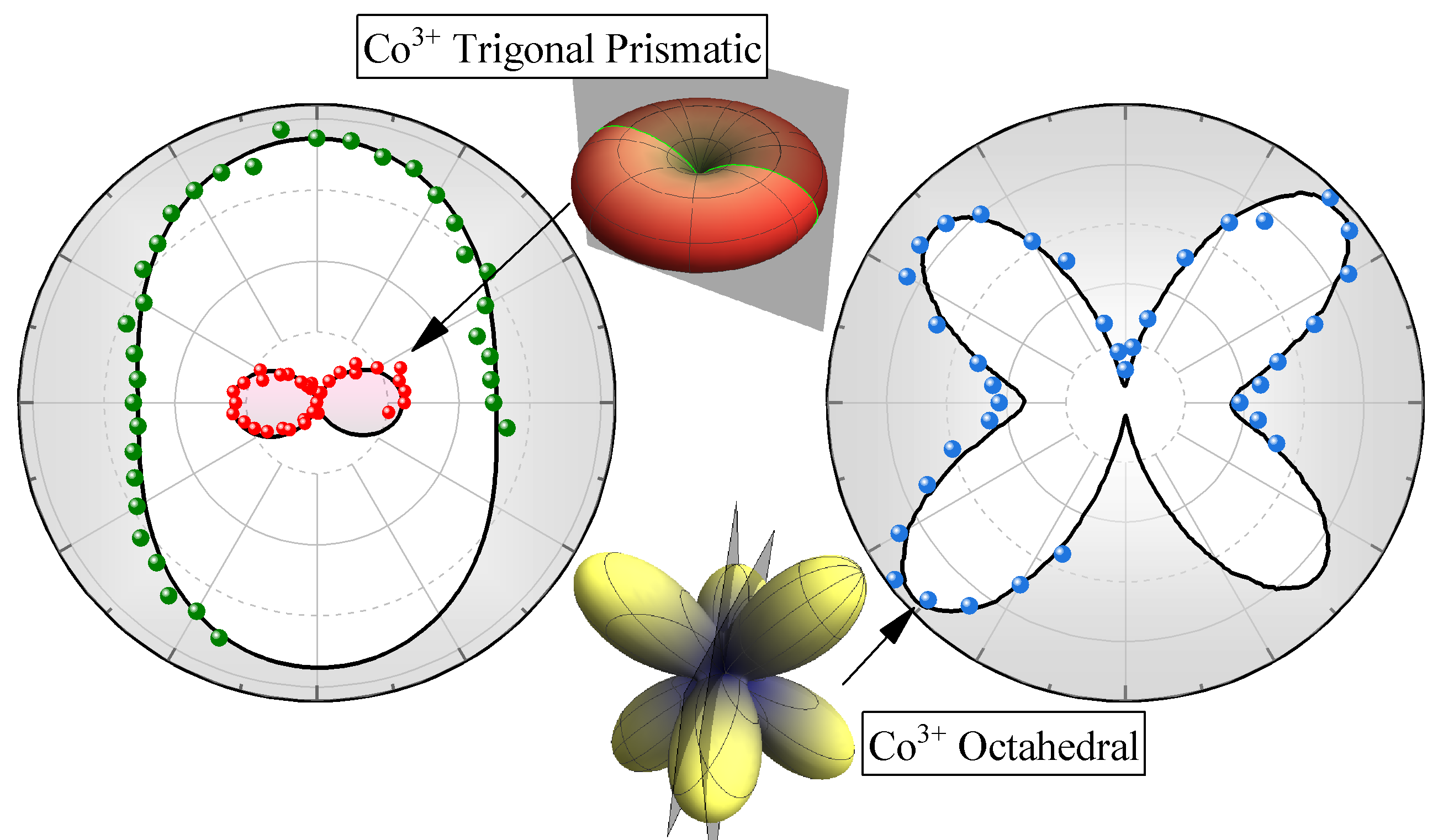
Fig. 2 For Ca_{3}Co_{2}O_{6} the red dots show a cross-sectional cut through the donut-like d_{2} orbital, highlighting the sixth (and active) electron responsible for the Ising magnetism in this compound.

It has also been applied to the Ising magnetic material Ca_{3}Co_{2}O_{6} (Fig. 2) in order to show specifically that it is the sixth electron on the high-spin trigonally coordinated cobalt site that gives rise to the observed bulk large orbital magnetic moment.
