= X-ray spectroscopy =

Technique to characterize materials using X-ray radiation

X-ray spectroscopy is a general term for several spectroscopic techniques for characterization of materials by using x-ray radiation.

== Characteristic X-ray spectroscopy ==
When an electron from the inner shell of an atom is excited by the energy of a photon, it moves to a higher energy level. When it returns to the low energy level, the energy it previously gained by excitation is emitted as a photon of one of the wavelengths uniquely characteristic of the element. Analysis of the X-ray emission spectrum produces qualitative results about the elemental composition of the specimen. Comparison of the specimen's spectrum with the spectra of samples of known composition produces quantitative results (after some mathematical corrections for absorption, fluorescence and atomic number).

Atoms can be excited by a high-energy beam of charged particles such as electrons (in an electron microscope for example), protons (see PIXE) or a beam of X-rays (see X-ray fluorescence, or XRF or also recently in transmission XRT). These methods enable elements from the entire periodic table to be analysed, with the exception of H, He and Li.

In electron microscopy an electron beam excites X-rays; there are two main techniques for analysis of spectra of characteristic X-ray radiation: energy-dispersive X-ray spectroscopy (EDS) and wavelength dispersive X-ray spectroscopy (WDS). In X-ray transmission (XRT), the equivalent atomic composition (Z_{eff}) is captured based on photoelectric and Compton effects.

Detection of X-ray spectra

An X-ray spectrometer serves as a vital instrument for detecting and analyzing the radiation emitted by various samples. Distinguishing the components of the X-ray beam based on their energy levels and intensities allows for a deeper exploration of the material's properties and its arrangement at the atomic level. This capability significantly enriches the understanding of the underlying characteristics of different substances.

=== Energy-dispersive X-ray spectroscopy ===
In an energy-dispersive X-ray spectrometer, a semiconductor detector measures the energy of incoming photons. To maintain detector integrity and resolution, it should be cooled with liquid nitrogen or by Peltier cooling. EDS is widely employed in electron microscopes (where imaging rather than spectroscopy is a main task) and in cheaper and/or portable XRF units.

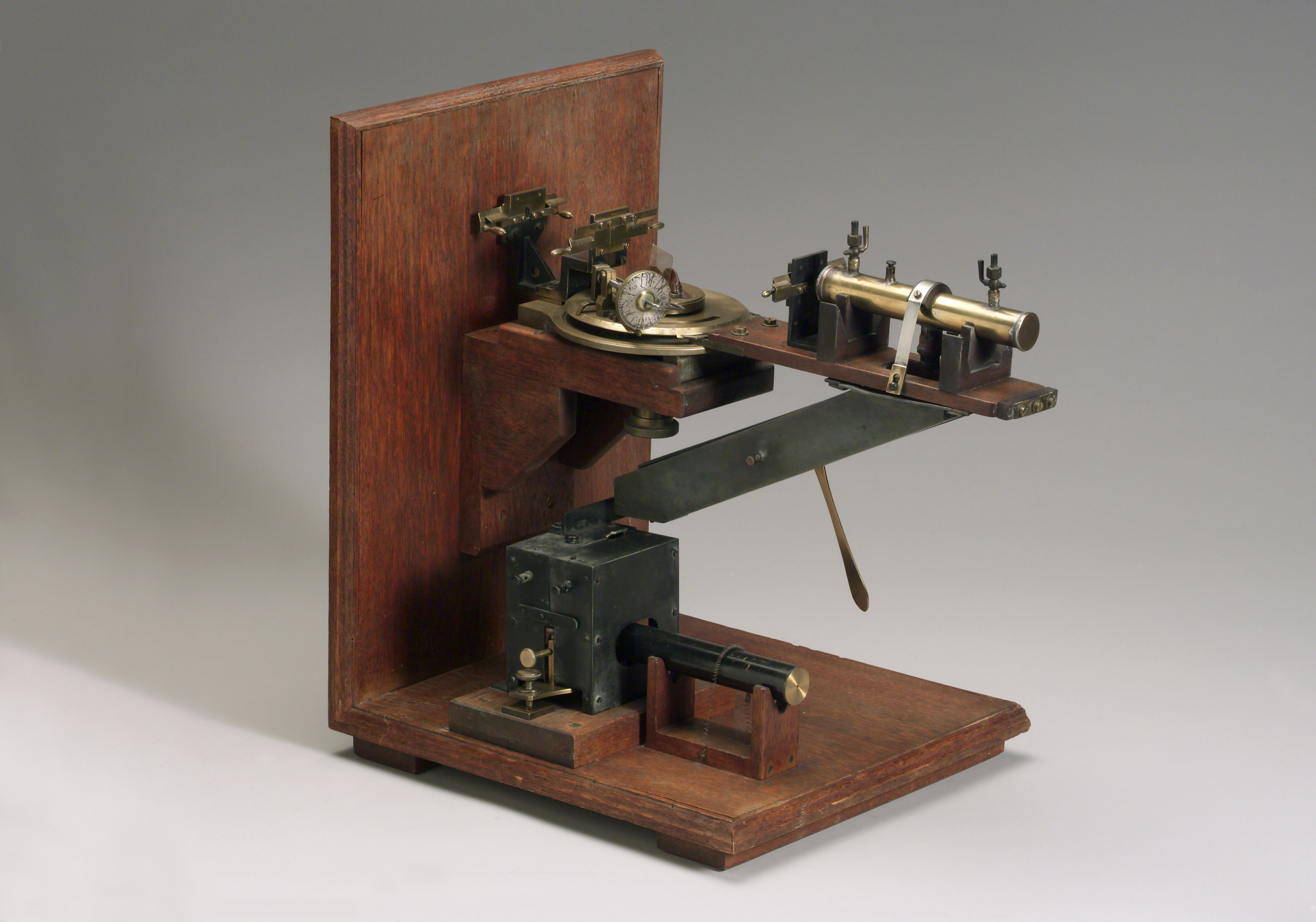
Bragg X-ray Spectrometer

=== Wavelength-dispersive X-ray spectroscopy ===
In a wavelength-dispersive X-ray spectrometer, a single crystal diffracts the photons according to Bragg's law, which are then collected by a detector. By moving the diffraction crystal and detector relative to each other, a wide region of the spectrum can be observed. To observe a large spectral range, three of four different single crystals may be needed. In contrast to EDS, WDS is a method of sequential spectrum acquisition. While WDS is slower than EDS and more sensitive to the positioning of the sample in the spectrometer, it has superior spectral resolution and sensitivity. WDS is widely used in microprobes (where X-ray microanalysis is the main task) and in XRF; it is widely used in the field of X-ray diffraction to calculate various data such as interplanar spacing and wavelength of the incident X-ray using Bragg's law.

Differences between EDS and WDS

Energy Dispersive X-ray Spectroscopy (EDS) analysis plays a crucial role in materials characterization by scanning the entire spectrum to identify unknown elements. However, one of the challenges in EDS is the identification of peaks, which can become complicated due to the presence of trace elements that may obscure results. Additionally, the overall detection resolution is often limited, leading to potential misinterpretations.

On the other hand, Wavelength Dispersive X-ray Spectroscopy (WDS) offers a more precise approach by analyzing one peak at a time, which allows for an accurate quantification of trace elements. This method also boasts higher resolution, making it significantly more effective for peak identification. As a result, WDS generally surpasses EDS in terms of detection resolution, providing clearer and more reliable data for detailed elemental analysis.

== X-ray emission spectroscopy ==
The father-and-son scientific team of William Lawrence Bragg and William Henry Bragg, who were 1915 Nobel Prize Winners, were the original pioneers in developing X-ray emission spectroscopy. An example of a spectrometer developed by William Henry Bragg, which was used by both father and son to investigate the structure of crystals, can be seen at the Science Museum, London. Jointly they measured the X-ray wavelengths of many elements to high precision, using high-energy electrons as excitation source. The cathode-ray tube or an x-ray tube was the method used to pass electrons through a crystal of numerous elements. They also painstakingly produced numerous diamond-ruled glass diffraction gratings for their spectrometers. The law of diffraction of a crystal is called Bragg's law in their honor.

Intense and wavelength-tunable X-rays are now typically generated with synchrotrons. In a material, the X-rays may suffer an energy loss compared to the incoming beam. This energy loss of the re-emerging beam reflects an internal excitation of the atomic system, an X-ray analogue to the well-known Raman spectroscopy that is widely used in the optical region.

In the X-ray region there is sufficient energy to probe changes in the electronic state (transitions between orbitals; this is in contrast with the optical region, where the energy emitted or absorbed is often due to changes in the state of the rotational or vibrational degrees of freedom of the system's atoms and groups of atoms). For instance, in the ultra soft X-ray region (below about 1 keV), crystal field excitations give rise to the energy loss.

The photon-in-photon-out process may be thought of as a scattering event. When the x-ray energy corresponds to the binding energy of a core-level electron, this scattering process is resonantly enhanced by many orders of magnitude. This type of X-ray emission spectroscopy is often referred to as resonant inelastic X-ray scattering (RIXS).

Due to the wide separation of orbital energies of the core levels, it is possible to select a certain atom of interest. The small spatial extent of core level orbitals forces the RIXS process to reflect the electronic structure in close vicinity of the chosen atom. Thus, RIXS experiments give valuable information about the local electronic structure of complex systems, and theoretical calculations are relatively simple to perform.

=== Instrumentation ===
There exist several efficient designs for analyzing an X-ray emission spectrum in the ultra soft X-ray region. The figure of merit for such instruments is the spectral throughput, i.e. the product of detected intensity and spectral resolving power. Usually, it is possible to change these parameters within a certain range while keeping their product constant.

==== Grating spectrometers ====
Usually X-ray diffraction in spectrometers is achieved on crystals, but in Grating spectrometers, the X-rays emerging from a sample must pass a source-defining slit, then optical elements (mirrors and/or gratings) disperse them by diffraction according to their wavelength and, finally, a detector is placed at their focal points.

==== Spherical grating mounts ====
Henry Augustus Rowland (1848–1901) devised an instrument that allowed the use of a single optical element that combines diffraction and focusing: a spherical grating. Reflectivity of X-rays is low, regardless of the used material and therefore, grazing incidence upon the grating is necessary. X-ray beams impinging on a smooth surface at a few degrees glancing angle of incidence undergo external total reflection which is taken advantage of to enhance the instrumental efficiency substantially.

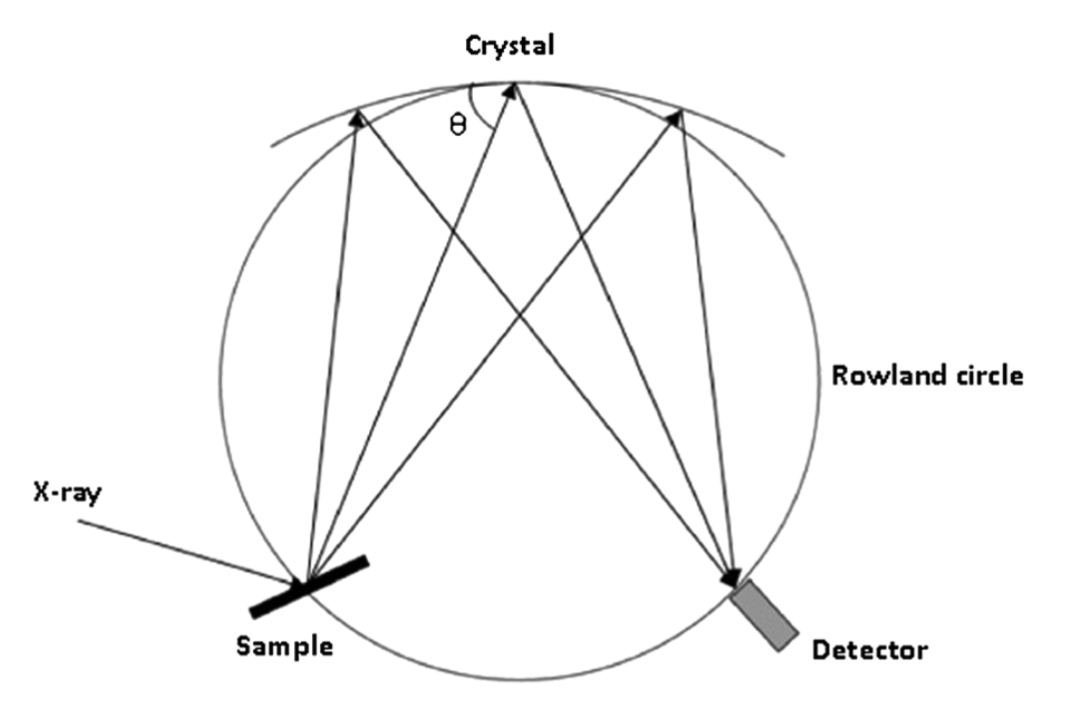
Schematic of Rowland circle geometry. The entrance slit, grating, and diffracted beam lie on the Rowland circle.

R denotes the radius of curvature of a spherical grating. The Rowland circle is an imaginary circle with a radius of R/2, positioned so that it is tangent to the center of the spherical grating surface. When both the entrance slit and the detector lie on this Rowland circle, light incident on the grating is both diffracted and focused by the same spherical grating. Each wavelength is diffracted at a specific angle according to Bragg's law, and the Rowland geometry ensures the diffracted beams come into focus along the circle. This setup allows for high spectral energy resolution without the need for additional focusing optics.

==== Plane grating mounts ====
Similar to optical spectrometers, a plane grating spectrometer first needs optics that turns the divergent rays emitted by the x-ray source into a parallel beam. This may be achieved by using a parabolic mirror. The parallel rays emerging from this mirror strike a plane grating (with constant groove distance) at the same angle and are diffracted according to their wavelength. A second parabolic mirror then collects the diffracted rays at a certain angle and creates an image on a detector. A spectrum within a certain wavelength range can be recorded simultaneously by using a two-dimensional position-sensitive detector such as a microchannel photomultiplier plate or an X-ray sensitive CCD chip (film plates are also possible to use).

==== Interferometers ====
Instead of using the concept of multiple beam interference that gratings produce, the two rays may simply interfere. By recording the intensity of two such co-linearly at some fixed point and changing their relative phase one obtains an intensity spectrum as a function of path length difference. One can show that this is equivalent to a Fourier transformed spectrum as a function of frequency. The highest recordable frequency of such a spectrum is dependent on the minimum step size chosen in the scan and the frequency resolution (i.e. how well a certain wave can be defined in terms of its frequency) depends on the maximum path length difference achieved. The latter feature allows a much more compact design for achieving high resolution than for a grating spectrometer because x-ray wavelengths are small compared to attainable path length differences.

==== Early history of X-ray spectroscopy in the U.S. ====
Philips Gloeilampen Fabrieken, headquartered in Eindhoven in the Netherlands, got its start as a manufacturer of light bulbs, but quickly evolved until it is now one of the leading manufacturers of electrical apparatus, electronics, and related products including X-ray equipment. It also has had one of the world's largest R&D labs. In 1940, the Netherlands was overrun by Hitler’s Germany. The company was able to transfer a substantial sum of money to a company that it set up as an R&D laboratory in an estate in Irvington on the Hudson in NY. As an extension to their work on light bulbs, the Dutch company had developed a line of X-ray tubes for medical applications that were powered by transformers. These X-ray tubes could also be used in scientific X-ray instrumentations, but there was very little commercial demand for the latter. As a result, management decided to try to develop this market and they set up development groups in their research labs in both Holland and the United States.

They hired Dr. Ira Duffendack, a professor at University of Michigan and a world expert on infrared research to head the lab and to hire a staff. In 1951 he hired Dr. David Miller as Assistant Director of Research. Dr. Miller had done research on X-ray instrumentation at Washington University in St. Louis. Dr. Duffendack also hired Dr. Bill Parish, a well known researcher in X-ray diffraction, to head up the section of the lab on X-ray instrumental development. X-ray diffraction units were widely used in academic research departments to do crystal analysis. An essential component of a diffraction unit was a very accurate angle measuring device known as a goniometer. Such units were not commercially available, so each investigator had do try to make their own. Dr Parrish decided this would be a good device to use to generate an instrumental market, so his group designed and learned how to manufacture a goniometer. This market developed quickly and, with the readily available tubes and power supplies, a complete diffraction unit was made available and was successfully marketed.

The U.S. management did not want the laboratory to be converted to a manufacturing unit so it decided to set up a commercial unit to further develop the X-ray instrumentation market. In 1953 Norelco Electronics was established in Mount Vernon, NY, dedicated to the sale and support of X-ray instrumentation. It included a sales staff, a manufacturing group, an engineering department and an applications lab. Dr. Miller was transferred from the lab to head up the engineering department. The sales staff sponsored three schools a year, one in Mount Vernon, one in Denver, and one in San Francisco. The week-long school curricula reviewed the basics of X-ray instrumentation and the specific application of Norelco products. The faculty were members of the engineering department and academic consultants. The schools were well attended by academic and industrial R&D scientists. The engineering department was also a new product development group. It added an X-ray spectrograph to the product line very quickly and contributed other related products for the next 8 years.

The applications lab was an essential sales tool. When the spectrograph was introduced as a quick and accurate analytical chemistry device, it was met with widespread skepticism. All research facilities had a chemistry department and analytical analysis was done by “wet chemistry” methods. The idea of doing this analysis by physics instrumentation was considered suspect. To overcome this bias, the salesman would ask a prospective customer for a task the customer was doing by “wet methods”. The task would be given to the applications lab and they would demonstrate how accurately and quickly it could be done using the X-ray units. This proved to be a very strong sales tool, particularly when the results were published in the Norelco Reporter, a technical journal issued monthly by the company with wide distribution to commercial and academic institutions.

An X-ray spectrograph consists of a high voltage power supply (50 kV or 100 kV), a broad band X-ray tube, usually with a tungsten anode and a beryllium window, a specimen holder, an analyzing crystal, a goniometer, and an X-ray detector device. These are arranged as shown in Fig. 1.

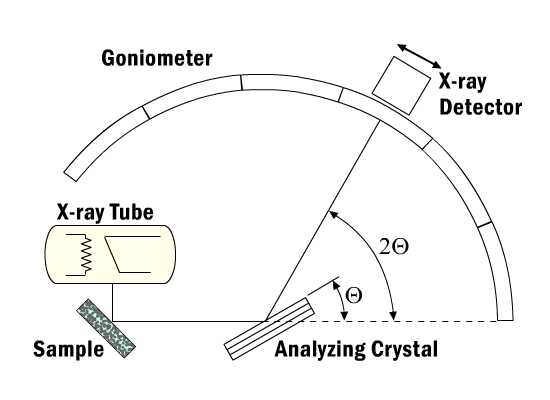
Fig. 1

The continuous X-spectrum emitted from the tube irradiates the specimen and excites the characteristic spectral X-ray lines in the specimen. Each of the 92 elements emits a characteristic spectrum. Unlike the optical spectrum, the X-ray spectrum is quite simple. The strongest line, usually the Kalpha line, but sometimes the Lalpha line, suffices to identify the element. The existence of a particular line betrays the existence of an element, and the intensity is proportional to the amount of the particular element in the specimen. The characteristic lines are reflected from a crystal, the analyzer, under an angle that is given by the Bragg condition. The crystal samples all the diffraction angles theta by rotation, while the detector rotates over the corresponding angle 2-theta. With a sensitive detector, the X-ray photons are counted individually. By stepping the detectors along the angle, and leaving it in position for a known time, the number of counts at each angular position gives the line intensity. These counts may be plotted on a curve by an appropriate display unit. The characteristic X-rays come out at specific angles, and since the angular position for every X-ray spectral line is known and recorded, it is easy to find the sample's composition.

A chart for a scan of a Molybdenum specimen is shown in Fig. 2. The tall peak on the left side is the characteristic alpha line at a two theta of 12 degrees. Second and third order lines also appear.

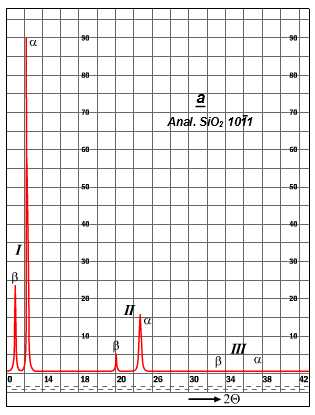
Fig. 2

Since the alpha line is often the only line of interest in many industrial applications, the final device in the Norelco X- ray spectrographic instrument line was the Autrometer. This device could be programmed to automatically read at any desired two theta angle for any desired time interval.

Soon after the Autrometer was introduced, Philips decided to stop marketing X-ray instruments developed in both the U.S. and Europe and settled on offering only the Eindhoven line of instruments.

In 1961, during the development of the Autrometer, Norelco was given a sub-contract from the Jet Propulsion Lab. The Lab was working on the instrument package for the Surveyor spaceship. The composition of the Moon’s surface was of major interest and the use of an X-ray detection instrument was viewed as a possible solution. Working with a power limit of 30 watts was very challenging, and a device was delivered but it wasn’t used. Later NASA developments did lead to an X-ray spectrographic unit that did make the desired moon soil analysis.

The Norelco efforts faded but the use of X-ray spectroscopy in units known as XRF instruments continued to grow. With a boost from NASA, units were finally reduced to handheld size and are seeing widespread use. Units are available from Bruker, Thermo Scientific, Elvatech Ltd. and SPECTRA.

== Other types of X-ray spectroscopy ==
- X-ray absorption spectroscopy
- X-ray magnetic circular dichroism

== See also ==
- Auger electron spectroscopy
- X-Ray Spectrometry (journal)
