= X-Ray Spectrometry (journal) =

- Discipline: X-ray spectrometry
- Language: English
- Edited by: Johan Boman and Liqiang Luo

Publication details
- History: 1972-present
- Publisher: John Wiley & Sons
- Frequency: Bimonthly
- Impact factor: 1.488 (2020)

Standard abbreviations
- ISO 4: X-Ray Spectrom.

Indexing
- CODEN: XRSPAX
- ISSN: 0049-8246 (print); 1097-4539 (web)
- LCCN: 72627130
- OCLC no.: 474795286

Links
- Journal homepage; Online access; Online archive

X-Ray Spectrometry is a bimonthly peer-reviewed scientific journal established in 1972 and published by John Wiley & Sons. It covers the theory and application of X-ray spectrometry. The current editors-in-chief are Johan Boman (University of Gothenburg) and Liqiang Luo (National Research Center of Geoanalysis).

== Abstracting and indexing ==
The journal is abstracted and indexed in:

- Aquatic Sciences & Fisheries Abstracts
- Chemical Abstracts Service
- Ceramic Abstracts/World Ceramic Abstracts
- Chemical Abstracts Service
- Chemistry Citation Index
- ChemWeb
- Computer & Information Systems Abstracts
- CSA Biological Sciences Database
- CSA Civil Engineering Abstracts
- CSA Mechanical & Transportation Engineering Abstracts
- CSA Technology Research Database
- Current Contents/Physical, Chemical & Earth Sciences
- Earthquake Engineering Abstracts
- Engineered Materials Abstracts
- INSPEC
- International Aerospace Abstracts & Database
- Materials Business File
- METADEX
- PASCAL
- Reaction Citation Index
- Science Citation Index
- Scopus

According to the Journal Citation Reports, the journal has a 2020 impact factor of 1.488, ranking it 30th out of 43 journals in the category "Spectroscopy".

== Notable articles ==
The highest-cited articles from this journal are:

1. Vekemans, B.; Janssens, K.; Vincze, L.; Adams, F.; Van Espen, P. (1994). "Analysis of X-ray spectra by iterative least squares (AXIL): New developments". X-Ray Spectrometry. 23 (6): 278. doi:10.1002/xrs.1300230609.
2. Packwood, R. H.; Brown, J. D. (1981). "A Gaussian expression to describe φ(ρz) curves for quantitative electron probe microanalysis". X-Ray Spectrometry. 10 (3): 138. doi:10.1002/xrs.1300100311.
3. Norrish, K.; Hutton, J. T. (1977). "Plant analyses by X-ray spectrometry I—Low atomic number elements, sodium to calcium". X-Ray Spectrometry. 6: 6–11. doi:10.1002/xrs.1300060104.
