= X-ray Raman scattering =

X-ray Raman scattering (XRS) is non-resonant inelastic scattering of X-rays from core electrons. It is analogous to vibrational Raman scattering, which is a widely used tool in optical spectroscopy, with the difference being that the wavelengths of the exciting photons fall in the X-ray regime and the corresponding excitations are from deep core electrons.

XRS is an element-specific spectroscopic tool for studying the electronic structure of matter. In particular, it probes the excited-state density of states (DOS) of an atomic species in a sample.

== Description ==
XRS is an inelastic X-ray scattering process, in which a high-energy X-ray photon gives energy to a core electron, exciting it to an unoccupied state. The process is in principle analogous to X-ray absorption (XAS), but the energy transfer plays the role of the X-ray photon energy absorbed in X-ray absorption, exactly as in Raman scattering in optics vibrational low-energy excitations can be observed by studying the spectrum of light scattered from a molecule.

Because the energy (and therefore wavelength) of the probing X-ray can be chosen freely and is usually in the hard X-ray regime, certain constraints of soft X-rays in the studies of electronic structure of the material are overcome. For example, soft X-ray studies may be surface sensitive and they require a vacuum environment. This makes studies of many substances, such as numerous liquids impossible using soft X-ray absorption. One of the most notable applications in which X-ray Raman scattering is superior to soft X-ray absorption is the study of soft X-ray absorption edges in high pressure. Whereas high-energy X-rays may pass through a high-pressure apparatus like a diamond anvil cell and reach the sample inside the cell, soft X-rays would be absorbed by the cell itself.

== History ==
In his report of finding of a new type of scattering, Sir Chandrasekhara Venkata Raman proposed that a similar effect should be found also in the X-ray regime. Around the same time, Bergen Davis and Dana Mitchell reported in 1928 on the fine-structure of the scattered radiation from graphite and noted that they had lines that seemed to be in agreement with carbon K shell energy. Several researchers attempted similar experiments in the late 1920s and early 1930s but the results could not always be confirmed. Often the first unambiguous observations of the XRS effect is credited to K. Das Gupta (reported findings 1959) and Tadasu Suzuki (reported 1964). It was soon realized that the XRS peak in solids was broadened by the solid-state effects and it appeared as a band, with a shape similar to that of a XAS spectrum. The potential of the technique was limited until modern synchrotron light sources became available. This is due to the very small XRS probability of the incident photons, requiring radiation with a very high intensity. Today, XRS techniques are rapidly growing in importance. They can be used to study near-edge X-ray absorption fine structure (NEXAFS or XANES) as well as extended X-ray absorption fine structure (EXAFS).

== Brief theory of XRS ==
XRS belongs to the class of non-resonant inelastic X-ray scattering, which has a cross section of

$${d^2 \sigma \over d \Omega d E}= \left({ d \sigma \over d \Omega }\right)_{\rm Th} \times S(q,E)$$.

Here, $(d \sigma / d \Omega )_{\rm Th}$ is the Thomson cross section, which signifies that the scattering is that of electromagnetic waves from electrons. The physics of the system under study is buried in the dynamic structure factor $S(q,E)$, which is a function of momentum transfer $q$ and energy transfer $E$. The dynamic structure factor contains all non-resonant electronic excitations, including not only the core-electron excitations observed in XRS but also e.g. plasmons, the collective fluctuations of valence electrons, and Compton scattering.

== Similarity to X-ray absorption ==
It was shown by Yukio Mizuno and Yoshihiro Ohmura in 1967 that at small momentum transfers $q$ the XRS contribution of the dynamic structure factor is proportional to the X-ray absorption spectrum. The main difference is that while the polarization vector of light couples to momentum of the absorbing electron in XAS, in XRS the momentum of the incident photon couples to the charge of the electron. Because of this, the momentum transfer of XRS plays the role of photon polarization of XAS.

== Applications ==
Electron orbital imaging utilizes the technique of X-ray Raman scattering to produce images of electron (or hole) orbitals.

== See also ==
- X-ray scattering techniques
- Resonant inelastic X-ray scattering (RIXS)
