= Guinier =

Guinier is a surname. Notable people with the surname include:

- André Guinier (1911–2000), French physicist
- Henri Guinier (1867–1927), French portrait and landscape painter
- Lani Guinier (1950–2022), American civil rights theorist
- Philibert Guinier (1876–1962), French botanist
