= Crystal field excitation =

Crystal field excitation is the electronic transition of an electron between two orbitals of an atom that is situated in a crystal field environment. They are often observed in coordination complexes of transition metals. Some examples of crystal field excitations are dd-transitions on a copper atom that is surrounded by an octahedron of oxygen atoms, or ff-transitions on the uranium atom in uranium antimonide.
