= John J. Rehr =

American physicist

- Born: Carlisle, Pennsylvania, USA
- Education: University of Michigan, Cornell University
- Known for: [ FEFF], XANES, EXAFS
- Awards: Arthur H. Compton Award., IXAS Edward Stern Prize
- Scientific career
- Fields: Physics, Condensed matter theory
- Workplaces: University of Washington
- Doctoral advisor: David Mermin

Notes
- Homepage: https://faculty.washington.edu/jjr/

John J. Rehr is an American theoretical physicist, professor emeritus of physics at the University of Washington in Seattle. He has worked in the field of theoreticalX-ray and electron-spectroscopies.

== Biography ==
Rehr received a B.S.E. in 1967 from the University of Michigan, followed by a Ph.D. from Cornell University, in 1972, in theoretical condensed matter physics with David Mermin as his advisory. He then held a NATO postdoctoral fellowship at King's College London and at University of California, San Diego, with Walter Kohn.

In 1975, he was appointed assistant professor in the Department of Physics at the University of Washington, rising to the rank of associate professor in 1980 and full professor in 1985. Rehr has held visiting appointments at Cornell University, Freie Universität Berlin, Lund University, Université de Poitiers and L'École Polytechnique (Paris). He has been a consulting professor at the Stanford Synchrotron Radiation Lightsource, Co-ordinator of the DOE Computational Materials Science Network, and leader of the Theoretical X-ray Beamline of the European Theoretical Spectroscopy Facility.

== Work ==
His works have received over 22,000 citations. His research specialties are in condensed matter theory, particularly in the field of excited state electronic structure and the theory of X-ray and electron spectra. One of Rehr's major accomplishment was the theoretical solution of the EXAFS problem, and quantitative theories of core-level x-ray and electron spectroscopies. Rehr is also the founding father of the first principles code FEFF8 and the principal investigator of the FEFF project. Rehr group's FEFF codes are in use worldwide and currently has over thousands of subscription.

Rehr has also led his team in developing next generation scientific computation on High Performance Computing resources and cloud computing platforms such as the Amazon Web Services cloud .

His research has largely been supported by the US Department of Energy BES.

== Honors and awards ==
Rehr received the Advanced Photon Source Arthur H. Compton Award in 2011 and the International XAFS Society's Achievement Award in 2006. He was elected a Fellow of the American Physical Society in 2001.

== Most cited publications ==
- “Real space multiple scattering calculation and interpretation of X-ray absorption near edge structure,” by A. Ankudinov, B. Ravel, J.J. Rehr, and S. Conradson, Physical ReviewB 58 7565 (1998). 2369 citations
- “Multiple-Scattering Calculations of X-ray Absorption Spectra,” S. I. Zabinsky, J. J. Rehr, A. Ankudinov, R. C. Albers and M. J. Eller, Phys. Rev. B 52, 2995 (1995). 1725 citations
- “Theoretical X-ray Absorption Fine Structure Standards,” J.J. Rehr, J. Mustre de Leon, S.I. Zabinsky, and R.C. Albers, J. Am. Chem. Soc. 113, 5135 (1991). 1443 citations
- “Theoretical Approaches to X-ray Absorption Fine Structure,” J. J. Rehr and R. C. Albers, Rev. Mod. Phys. 72, 621, (2000). 1051 citations
- “High-order multiple-scattering calculations of x-ray-absorption fine structure,” J.J. Rehr, R.C. Albers, and S.I. Zabinsky, Phys. Rev. Lett. 69, 3397 (1992). 1032 citations
