= X-ray absorption fine structure =

Specific structure observed in X-ray absorption spectroscopy

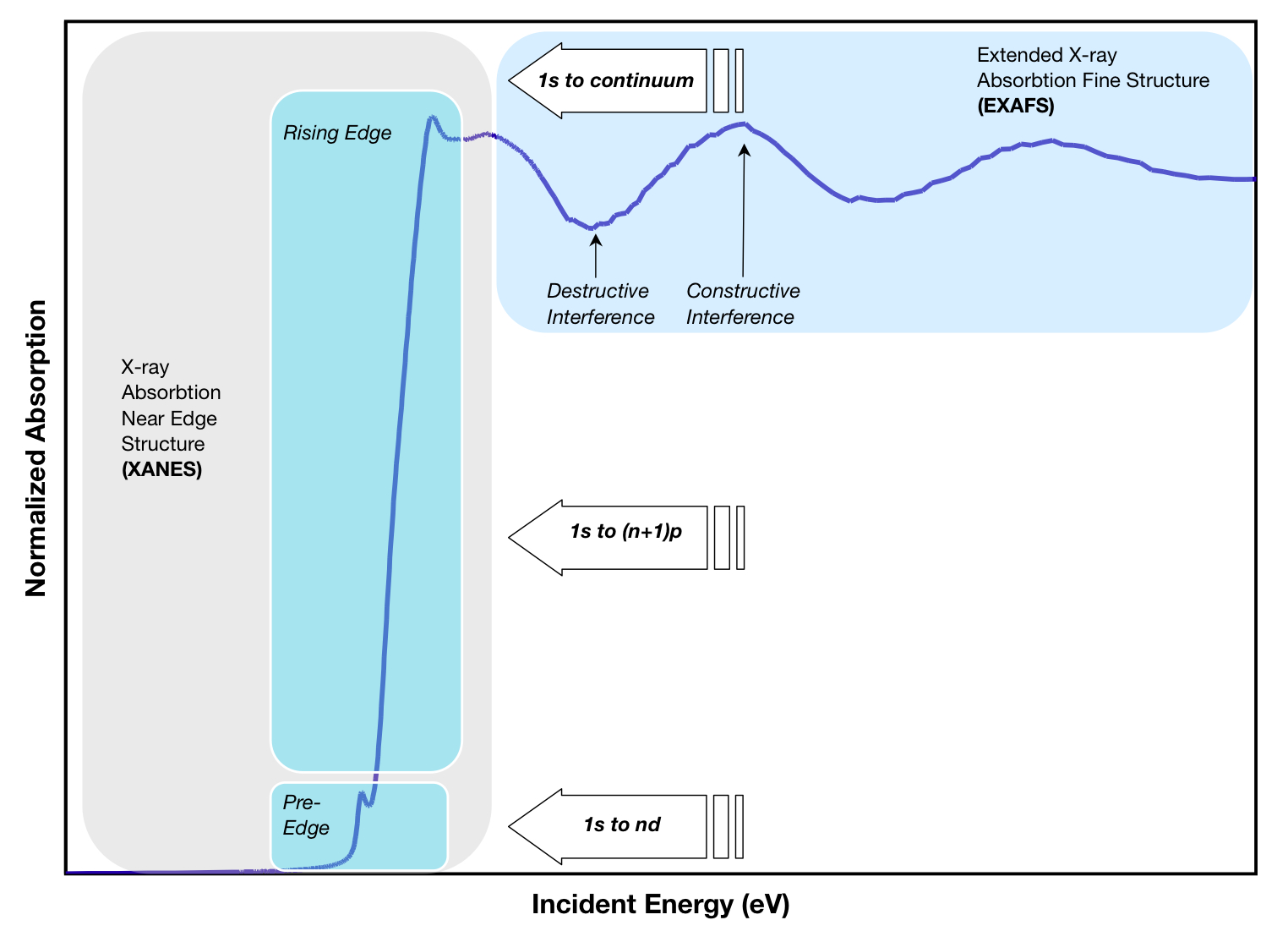
Three regions of XAS data

X-ray absorption fine structure (XAFS) is a specific structure observed in X-ray absorption spectroscopy (XAS). By analyzing the XAFS, information can be acquired on the local structure and on the unoccupied local electronic states.

== Atomic spectra ==
The atomic X-ray absorption spectrum (XAS) of a core-level in an absorbing atom is separated into states in the discrete part of the spectrum called "bounds final states" or "Rydberg states" below the ionization potential (IP) and "states in the continuum" part of the spectrum above the ionization potential due to excitations of the photoelectron in the vacuum. Above the IP the absorption cross section attenuates gradually with the X-ray energy. Following early experimental and theoretical works in the thirties, in the sixties using synchrotron radiation at the National Bureau of Standards it was established that the broad asymmetric absorption peaks are due to Fano resonances above the atomic ionization potential where the final states are many body quasi-bound states (i.e., a doubly excited atom) degenerate with the continuum.

== Spectra of molecules and condensed matter ==
The XAS spectra of condensed matter are usually divided in three energy regions:

=== Edge region ===
The edge region usually extends in a range of few eV around the absorption edge. The spectral features in the edge region i) in good metals are excitations to final delocalized states above the Fermi level; ii) in insulators are core excitons below the ionization potential; iii) in molecules are electronic transitions to the first unoccupied molecular levels above the chemical potential in the initial states which are shifted into the discrete part of the core absorption spectrum by the Coulomb interaction with the core hole. Multi-electron excitations and configuration interaction between many body final states dominate the edge region in strongly correlated metals and insulators. For many years the edge region was referred to as the “Kossel structure” but now it is known as "absorption edge region" since the Kossel structure refers only to unoccupied molecular final states which is a correct description only for few particular cases: molecules and strongly disordered systems.

=== X-ray Absorption Near Edge Structure ===
The XANES energy region extends between the edge region and the EXAFS region over a 50-100 eV energy range around the core level x-ray absorption threshold. Before 1980 the XANES region was wrongly assigned to different final states: a) unoccupied total density of states, or b) unoccupied molecular orbitals (Kossel structure) or c) unoccupied atomic orbitals or d) low energy EXAFS oscillations. In the seventies, using synchrotron radiation in Frascati and Stanford synchrotron sources, it was experimentally shown that the features in this energy region are due to multiple scattering resonances of the photoelectron in a nanocluster of variable size. Antonio Bianconi in 1980 invented the acronym XANES to indicate the spectral region dominated by multiple scattering resonances of the photoelectron in the soft x-ray range and in the hard X-ray range. In the XANES energy range the kinetic energy of the photoelectron in the final state is between few eV and 50-100 eV. In this regime the photoelectron has a strong scattering amplitude by neighboring atoms in molecules and condensed matter, its wavelength is larger than interatomic distances, its mean free path could be smaller than one nanometer and finally the lifetime of the excited state is in the order of femtoseconds. The XANES spectral features are described by full multiple scattering theory proposed in the early seventies. Therefore, the key step for XANES interpretation is the determination of the size of the atomic cluster of neighbor atoms, where the final states are confined, which could range from 0.2 nm to 2 nm in different systems. This energy region has been called later (in 1982) also near-edge X-ray absorption fine structure (NEXAFS), which is synonymous with XANES. During more than 20 years the XANES interpretation has been object of discussion but recently there is agreement that the final states are "multiple scattering resonances" and many body final states play an important role.

=== Intermediate region ===
There is an intermediate region between the XANES and EXAFS regions where low n-body distribution functions play a key role.

=== Extended X-ray absorption fine structure ===
The oscillatory structure extending for hundreds of electron volts past the edges was called the “Kronig structure” after the scientist, Ralph Kronig, who assigned this structure in the high energy range ( i.e., for a kinetic energy range - larger than 100 eV - of the photoelectron in the weak scattering regime) to the single scattering of the excited photoelectron by neighbouring atoms in molecules and condensed matter. This regime was called EXAFS in 1971 by Sayers, Stern and Lytle. and it developed only after the use of intense synchrotron radiation sources.

== Applications of x-ray absorption spectroscopy ==
X-ray absorption edge spectroscopy corresponds to the transition from a core-level to an unoccupied orbital or band and mainly reflects the electronic unoccupied states. EXAFS, resulting from the interference in the single scattering process of the photoelectron scattered by surrounding atoms, provides information on the local structure. Information on the geometry of the local structure is provided by the analysis of the multiple scattering peaks in the XANES spectra. The XAFS acronym has been later introduced to indicate the sum of the XANES and EXAFS spectra.

== See also ==
- SEXAFS
- EXAFS
- XANES
