= Rehr =

Rehr is a surname. Notable people with the surname include:

- Helen Rehr (1919–2013), American medical social worker
- John J. Rehr (graduated 1967), American theoretical physicist

== See also ==
- Rohr (surname)
