= Kronig =

Kronig or Krönig may refer to:

People:

- Alfred Kronig (1928–2020), Swiss cross country skier who competed in the 1950s
- August Karl Krönig (1822–1879), German chemist and physicist
- Ralph Kronig (1904–1995), German-American physicist noted for the discovery of particle spin and his theory of x-ray absorption spectroscopy

Mathematics and Science:

- Coster Kronig transition, special case of the Auger process in which the vacancy is filled by an electron from a higher subshell of the same shell
- Kramers–Kronig relations, mathematical properties connecting real and imaginary parts of any complex function which is analytic in the upper half plane

== See also ==
- König (disambiguation)
