= Joachim Stöhr =

German physicist

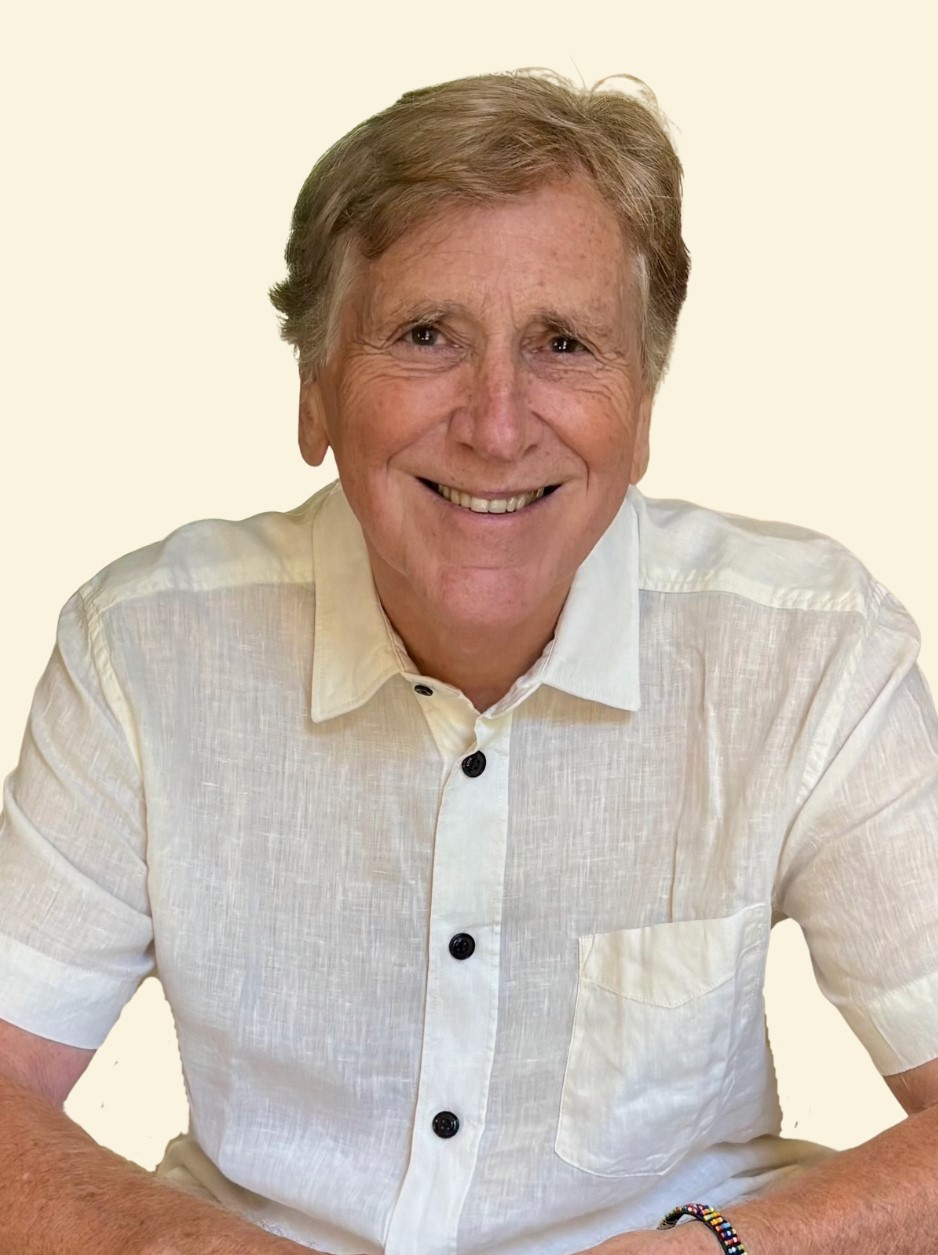
- Joachim Stöhr in 2025
- Born: September 28, 1947; Meinerzhagen, Germany
- Education: Bonn University, 1968; M.S. Washington State University, 1971; PhD Technical University of Munich, 1974
- Known for: X-ray and synchrotron radiation techniques
- Spouse: Linda Buckman
- Awards: Fellow of the American Physical Society, since 1988; Davisson–Germer Prize, 2011
- Scientific career
- Fields: Physics
- Institutions: Lawrence Berkeley National Laboratory; Stanford Synchrotron Radiation Laboratory; Stanford University; EXXON Corporate Research Laboratory; IBM Almaden Research Center
- Thesis: Mössbauer Untersuchungen an Seltenen Erden als magnetische Verunreinigungen in Metallen (1974)

Joachim Stöhr (born September 28, 1947) is a physicist and professor emeritus of the Photon Science Department of Stanford University. His research has focused on the development of X-ray and synchrotron radiation techniques and their applications in different scientific fields with emphasis on surface science and magnetism. During his career he also held several scientific leadership positions, such as the director of the Stanford Synchrotron Radiation Laboratory (SSRL) and he was the founding director of the Linac Coherent Light Source (LCLS), the world's first x-ray free electron laser.

== Career ==
Stöhr was born in Meinerzhagen, Germany. His university education was at Bonn University and Washington State University, where he spent two years as a Fulbright scholar and received a Master of Science degree. In 1974 he received his Ph.D. in Physics from the Technical University of Munich. After postdoctoral work and a scientific staff position at Lawrence Berkeley National Laboratory he worked as a staff scientist at the Stanford Synchrotron Radiation Laboratory (SSRL) and at EXXON Corporate Research Laboratory. He then spent nearly fifteen years at the IBM Almaden Research Center, where he conducted x-ray research in the areas of surface science and magnetic materials and managed various research departments. He became a Fellow of the American Physical Society in 1988. In January 2000, he joined the faculty of Stanford University as Professor and was appointed Deputy Director of SSRL. In 2005 he became the fourth Director of SSRL and an Associate Director of the Stanford Linear Accelerator Center (SLAC). From 2009 to 2013 he was the first Director of the Linac Coherent Light Source (LCLS). He became Emeritus Professor at Stanford in 2017.

Besides his books, Stöhr is the author of more than 250 scientific publications and several patents. He has served on many national and international advisory committees, most notably, the Basic Energy Sciences Advisory Committee (BESAC) of the U.S. Department of Energy. In 2011 he was awarded the Davisson–Germer Prize in Atomic or Surface Physics by the American Physical Society.

== Research ==
Stöhr’s research has focused on the development of novel investigative techniques based on soft x-ray synchrotron radiation for exploring the structure, electronic and magnetic properties of surfaces and thin films. He played a major role in developing the surface extended x-ray absorption fine structure (SEXAFS) technique as a tool for exploring surface structures, especially atoms bonded to surfaces. He also developed the near edge x-ray absorption fine structure (NEXAFS) technique for the study of simple and complex molecules bonded to surfaces and for the study of thin polymer films. The technique is described in his book “NEXAFS Spectroscopy” (Springer, 1992). NEXAFS is widely used today, often in combination with x-ray microscopes, for the study of organic systems like polymers and biological cells.

Starting in the early 1990s he has concentrated on the use of polarized soft x-rays to study magnetic materials and phenomena, especially thin films, interfaces and nanoscale structures. He has pioneered x-ray magnetic spectro-microscopy which allows the direct observation of nanoscale antiferromagnetic and ferromagnetic domain structures with elemental and chemical state specificity. He has also pioneered time-resolved x-ray microscopy techniques with picosecond time resolution. These studies and more generally the whole field of magnetism form the topic of his second book, “Magnetism – From Fundamentals to Nanoscale Dynamics” (Springer, 2006), which he co-authored with Hans Christoph Siegmann.

His latest interest is the development and exploration of non-linear x-ray phenomena. Such phenomena could be conveniently ignored during the first one hundred years of x-ray science because even for the most advanced synchrotron radiation sources, x-ray interactions with matter proceeded one-photon-at-a-time. Similar to the advent of conventional lasers in the 1960s, the emergence of x-ray lasers now requires the extension of the conventional description of x-ray interactions with matter through the concepts of quantum optics. Experiments and theory of non-linear effects, where two or more x-rays work together, are a central part of his book "The Nature of X-Rays and their Interactions with Matter" (Springer 2023).

== Published books ==
- Joachim Stöhr (1992). NEXAFS Spectroscopy. Springer Science & Business Media. ISBN 978-3-540-54422-7.
- Joachim Stöhr; Hans Christoph Siegmann (2007). Magnetism: From Fundamentals to Nanoscale Dynamics. Springer Science & Business Media. ISBN 978-3-540-30283-4.
- Joachim Stöhr (2023). The Nature of X-Rays and their Interactions with Matter. Springer Science & Business Media. ISBN 978-3-031-20743-3.
- Joachim Stöhr (2026). The Nature of X-Rays and Their Interactions with Matter—Volume I. Springer Science & Business Media. ISBN 978-3-032-07630-4.
- Joachim Stöhr (2026). The Nature of X-Rays and Their Interactions with Matter—Volume II. Springer Science & Business Media. ISBN 978-3-032-07634-2.
