= Ritva Serimaa =

Physicist and professor

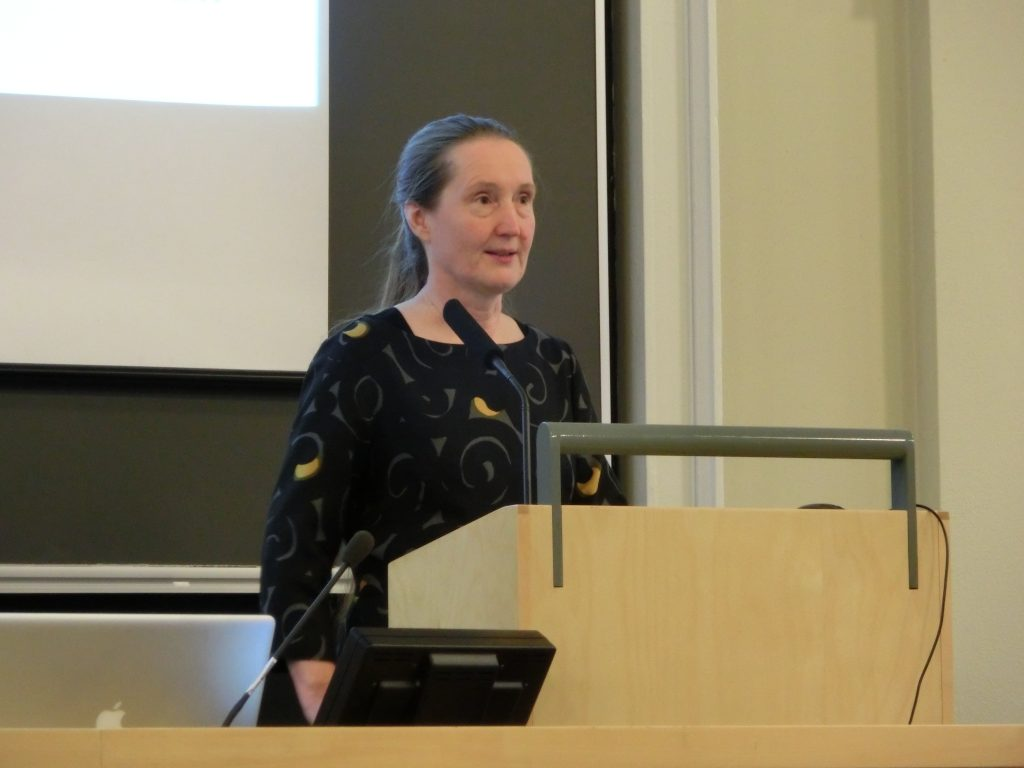
- Education: University of Helsinki

Ritva Serimaa (née Ström) (September 20, 1957, Hamina – April 12, 2016, Hamina) was a Finnish physicist and professor, the first female professor of physics at the University of Helsinki. She gained her master's degree in 1982 and defended her doctoral thesis in 1990, becoming a docent of the University of Helsinki in 1992. Her doctoral thesis work and later research concerned X-ray physics and scattering. From 1991 to 1993 she worked at Stanford University making use of their synchrotron light source SSRL. One research focus was the structure of the preserved Swedish warship Vasa, whose structure was at risk due to damage from sulfur-containing compounds. From 2004 she was professor of physics at the University of Helsinki, the first woman to hold such a post.

Serimaa supervised 16 doctoral theses and published at least 230 peer-reviewed articles. In 2010 she was made a member of the Finnish Academy of Science and Letters. In 2011 she became the first female chair of the Finnish Physical Society.

Serimaa married the physicist Olli Serimaa in 1982.
