= FEFF (disambiguation) =

U+FEFF is a Unicode character with two meanings:

- Byte order mark, previously used as zero-width no-break space
- Word joiner, Unicode character U+2060, a replacement for U+FEFF

FEFF may also refer to:

- Bangui M'Poko International Airport, an airport in Central African Republic with the airport code FEFF.
- FEFF (software), a program used in X-ray absorption spectroscopy.
- Far East Film Festival, an annual film festival held in Udine, Italy.
