= Surface-extended X-ray absorption fine structure =

Surface Sensitive equivalent

Surface-extended X-ray absorption fine structure (SEXAFS) is the surface-sensitive equivalent of the EXAFS technique. This technique involves the illumination of the sample by high-intensity X-ray beams from a synchrotron and monitoring their photoabsorption by detecting in the intensity of Auger electrons as a function of the incident photon energy. Surface sensitivity is achieved by the interpretation of data depending on the intensity of the Auger electrons (which have an escape depth of ~1–2 nm) instead of looking at the relative absorption of the X-rays as in the parent method, EXAFS.

The photon energies are tuned through the characteristic energy for the onset of core level excitation for surface atoms. The core holes thus created can then be filled by nonradiative decay of a higher-lying electron and communication of energy to yet another electron, which can then escape from the surface (Auger emission). The photoabsorption can therefore be monitored by direct detection of these Auger electrons to the total photoelectron yield. The absorption coefficient versus incident photon energy contains oscillations which are due to the interference of the backscattered Auger electrons with the outward propagating waves. The period of this oscillations depends on the type of the backscattering atom and its distance from the central atom. Thus, this technique enables the investigation of interatomic distances for adsorbates and their coordination chemistry.

This technique benefits from long range order not being required, which sometimes becomes a limitation in the other conventional techniques like LEED (about 10 nm). This method also largely eliminates the background from the signal. It also benefits because it can probe different species in the sample by just tuning the X-ray photon energy to the absorption edge of that species. Joachim Stöhr played a major role in the initial development of this technique.

== Experimental setup ==
=== Synchrotron radiation sources ===
Normally, the SEXAFS work is done using synchrotron radiation as it has highly collimated, plane-polarized and precisely pulsed X-ray sources, with fluxes of 10^{12} to 10^{14} photons/sec/mrad/mA and greatly improves the signal-to-noise ratio over that obtainable from conventional sources. A bright source X-ray source is illuminating the sample and the transmission is being measured as the absorption coefficient as

$$\begin{align}
\mu =  \frac{\ln(I)}{\ln(I_o)},
\end{align}$$

where I is the transmitted and I_{o} is the incident intensity of the X-rays. Then it is plotted against the energy of the incoming X-ray photon energy.

=== Electron detectors ===
In SEXAFS, an electron detector and a high-vacuum chamber is required to calculate the Auger yields instead of the intensity of the transmitted X-ray waves. The detector can be either an energy analyzer, as in the case of Auger measurements, or an electron multiplier, as in the case of total or partial secondary electron yield. The energy analyzer gives rise to better resolution while the electron multiplier has larger solid angle acceptance.

=== Signal-to-noise ratio ===
The equation governing the signal-to-noise ratio is

$$\frac{S}{N} = \sqrt { \frac{(\frac{\Omega}{4\pi}\epsilon_n  \mu_A)}{(1+ \frac{I_{b}}{I_n}(\mu_{T}+n))} } \left(\frac{\delta\mu_A}{\mu_A}I_o^{1/2}\right),$$

where

- μ_{A} is the absorption coefficient;
- I_{n} is the nonradiative contribution in electron counts/sec;
- I_{b} is the background contribution in electron counts/sec;
- μ_{A} is the absorption by the SEXAFS-producing element;
- μ_{T} is the total absorption by all the elements;
- I_{o} is the incident intensity;
- n is the attenuation length;
- Ω/(4π) is the solid angle acceptance for the detector;
- ε_{n} is the nonradiative yield which is the probability that the electron will not decay radiatively and will actually get emitted as an Auger electron.

== Physics ==
=== Basics ===
The absorption of an X-ray photon by the atom excites a core level electron, thus generating a core hole. This generates a spherical electron wave with the excited atom as the center. The wave propagates outwards and get scattered off from the neighbouring atoms and is turned back towards the central ionized atom. The oscillatory component of the photoabsorption originates from the coupling of this reflected wave to the initial state via the dipole operator M_{fs} as in (1). The Fourier transform of the oscillations gives the information about the spacing of the neighboring atoms and their chemical environment. This phase information is carried over to the oscillations in the Auger signal because the transition time in Auger emission is of the same order of magnitude as the average time for a photoelectron in the energy range of interest. Thus, with a proper choice of the absorption edge and characteristic Auger transition, measurement of the variation of the intensity in a particular Auger line as a function of incident photon energy would be a measure of the photoabsorption cross section.

This excitation also triggers various decay mechanisms. These can be of radiative (fluorescence) or nonradiative (Auger and Coster–Kronig) nature. The intensity ratio between the Auger electron and X-ray emissions depends on the atomic number Z. The yield of the Auger electrons decreases with increasing Z.

=== Theory of EXAFS ===
The cross section of photoabsorption is given by Fermi's golden rule, which, in the dipole approximation, is given as

$$P=\frac{2\pi}{\hbar}\sum_f |M_{fs}|^2 \delta (E_i + \hbar \omega - E_f),$$

$$M_{fs}= \langle f|e\mathbf\epsilon\cdot\mathbf r|i\rangle,$$

where the initial state, i with energy E_{i}, consists of the atomic core and the Fermi sea, and the incident radiation field, the final state, ƒ with energy E_{ƒ} (larger than the Fermi level), consists of a core hole and an excited electron. ε is the polarization vector of the electric field, e the electron charge, and ħω the x-ray photon energy. The photoabsorption signal contains a peak when the core level excitation is neared. It is followed by an oscillatory component which originates from the coupling of that part of the electron wave which upon scattering by the medium is turned back towards the central ionized atom, where it couples to the initial state via the dipole operator, M_{i}.

Assuming single-scattering and small-atom approximation for kR_{j} >> 1, where R_{j} is the distance from the central excited atom to the jth shell of neighbors and k is the photoelectrons wave vector,

$$k =  \frac{1}{\hbar}  \sqrt{[2m (\hbar ( \omega - \omega_T )+ V_o)]},$$

where ħω_{T} is the absorption edge energy and V_{o} is the inner potential of the solid associated with exchange and correlation, the following expression for the oscillatory component of the photoabsorption cross section (for K-shell excitation) is obtained:

$$\chi(k)=k^{-1}|f(k,\pi)|\sum_j\ W_j\sin[2kR_j+\alpha(k)]\exp(-\gamma R_j-2\sigma_j^2k^2),$$

where the atomic scattering factor in a partial wave expansion with partial wave phase-shifts δ_{l} is given by

$$f(k,\theta)= (1/k)\sum_{l=0}^\infty\ (2l+1)[\exp(2i\delta_{l}(k))-1]P_{l}(\cos\theta).$$

P_{l}(x) is the lth Legendre polynomial, γ is an attenuation coefficient, exp(−2σ_{i}^{2}k^{2}) is a Debye–Waller factor and weight W_{j} is given in terms of the number of atoms in the jth shell and their distance as

$$W_{j} = \frac{N_j}{R_j^2}.$$

The above equation for the χ(k) forms the basis of a direct, Fourier transform, method of analysis which has been successfully applied to the analysis of the EXAFS data.

=== Incorporation of EXAFS-Auger ===
The number of electrons arriving at the detector with an energy of the characteristic W_{α}XY Auger line (where W_{α} is the absorption edge core-level of element α, to which the incident x-ray line has been tuned) can be written as

$$N_{T} = N_{W_{\alpha}XY}(\hbar \omega) + N_{B}(\hbar \omega),$$

where N_{B}(ħω) is the background signal and $N_{W_{\alpha}XY}(\hbar \omega)$ is the Auger signal we are interested in, where

$N_{W_{\alpha}XY}(\hbar \omega) = (4 \pi)^{-1}\psi_{W_{\alpha} XY}[1-\kappa]\int_\Omega \int_0^\infty \ \rho_{\alpha}(z)\,\,P_{W_{\alpha}}(\hbar \omega; z)\exp\left[\frac {-z}{\lambda(W_{\alpha} XY)}\cos\theta\right]\ dzd\Omega,$

where $\psi_{W_{ \alpha} XY}$ is the probability that an excited atom will decay via W_{α}XY Auger transition, ρ_{α}(z) is the atomic concentration of the element α at depth z, λ(W_{α}XY) is the mean free path for an W_{α}XY Auger electron, θ is the angle that the escaping Auger electron makes with the surface normal and κ is the photon emission probability which is dictated the atomic number. As the photoabsorption probability, $P_{W_{\alpha}}(\hbar \omega; z)$ is the only term that is dependent on the photon energy, the oscillations in it as a function of energy would give rise to similar oscillations in the $N_{W_{\alpha}XY}(\hbar \omega)$.
