= Uwe Bergmann =

German physicist

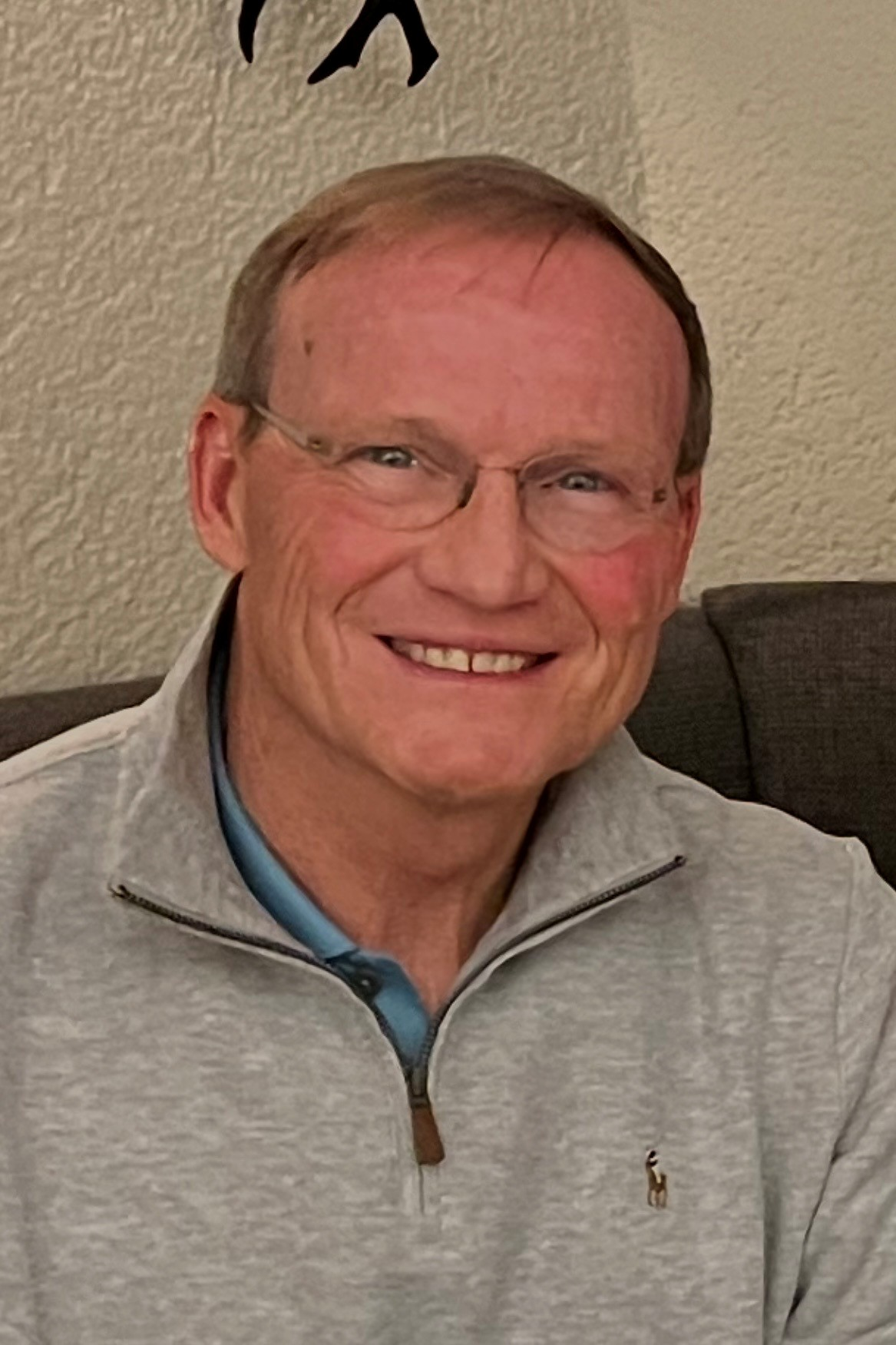
- Bergmann 2026
- Education: State University of New York at Stony Brook (Ph.D.); University of Hamburg (Diplom); Karlsruhe Institute of Technology (Pre-Diplom)
- Known for: Development of synchrotron and X-ray free-electron laser techniques
- Scientific career
- Fields: Physics; Ultrafast X-ray science X-ray spectroscopy
- Workplaces: University of Wisconsin-Madison; SLAC National Accelerator Laboratory; Lawrence Berkeley National Laboratory; European Synchrotron Radiation Facility
- Website: bergmann.physics.wisc.edu

Uwe Bergmann is a German-American physicist and the Martin L. Perl Endowed Professor in Ultrafast X-ray Science in the Department of Physics at the University of Wisconsin-Madison. His research focuses on the development and application of synchrotron radiation and X-ray free-electron laser (XFEL) techniques, including X-ray emission spectroscopy, resonant inelastic X-ray scattering, and X-ray fluorescence imaging.

Bergmann held senior leadership roles at the SLAC National Accelerator Laboratory, including Deputy Director (2009-2013) and Interim Director (2013-2014) of the Linac Coherent Light Source (LCLS), the world’s first hard X-ray free-electron laser.

== Early life and education ==
Bergmann is from Karlsruhe, Germany. He earned a Pre-Diplom in Physics from the Karlsruhe Institute of Technology (1986), a Diplom in Physics from the University of Hamburg (1990), and a Ph.D. in Physics from Stony Brook University in 1994.

== Career ==
Following his Ph.D., Bergmann completed postdoctoral research at the European Synchrotron Radiation Facility in Grenoble, France (1994-1996) and at Lawrence Berkeley National Laboratory (1996-1999). He subsequently held positions as a scientist at Lawrence Berkeley National Laboratory (1999-2003), Staff Scientist and Senior Staff Scientist at the Stanford Synchrotron Radiation Lightsource (SSRL) and SLAC National Accelerator Laboratory (2003-2015), Deputy Director of the LCLS (2009-2013), and Interim Director of the LCLS (2013-2014).

In 2020, he joined the University of Wisconsin-Madison as Professor of Physics and was appointed the Martin L. Perl Endowed Professor in Ultrafast X-ray Science. He maintains affiliate faculty appointments in the departments of Chemistry and Materials Science and Engineering at UW-Madison, as well as a visiting professorship at SLAC.

== Research ==
Bergmann’s research centers on advancing synchrotron and XFEL-based X-ray techniques for time-resolved spectroscopy and imaging, often in large international collaborations. Key contributions include:

- X-ray fluorescence imaging of cultural heritage - He led the development of rapid-scan X-ray fluorescence imaging at SSRL, which non-destructively revealed hidden text in the Archimedes Palimpsest, a 10th-century parchment overwritten with medieval prayers.
- Ultrafast studies of photosynthesis - Using XFEL pulses, his collaborations have captured structural intermediates in the oxygen-evolving complex of photosystem II during water oxidation.
- Stimulated X-ray emission and attosecond pulses - Recent work demonstrated the first attosecond-scale hard X-ray lasing.

His techniques have also been applied to the structure of water and aqueous solutions, functional 2D materials, hydrocarbons, and paleontological specimens such as the Archaeopteryx fossil.

== Selected publications ==
- Linker, T. M.; et al. (2025). "Attosecond inner-shell lasing at ångström wavelengths". Nature. 642: 934–940. doi:10.1038/s41586-025-09105-9. PMC 12314423.
- Bhowmick, A.; et al. (2023). "Structural evidence for intermediates during O₂ formation in photosystem II". Nature. 617 (7961): 629–636. doi:10.1038/s41586-023-06038-z. PMC 10191843.
- Bergmann, U.; et al. (2021). "Using X-ray free-electron lasers for spectroscopy of molecular catalysts and metalloenzymes". Nature Reviews Physics. 3 (4): 264–282. doi:10.1038/s42254-021-00289-3. PMC 8245202.
- Lancaster, K. M.; et al. (2011). "X-Ray Emission Spectroscopy Evidences a Central Carbon in the Nitrogenase Iron-Molybdenum Cofactor". Science. 334 (6058): 974–977. doi:10.1126/science.1206445. PMC 3800678.
- Bergmann, U.; et al. (2010). "Archaeopteryx feathers and bone chemistry fully revealed via synchrotron imaging". Proceedings of the National Academy of Sciences. 107 (20): 9060–9065. doi:10.1073/pnas.1001569107. PMC 2889062.
- Bergmann, U. (2007). "Archimedes brought to light". Physics World. 20 (11): 39. doi:10.1088/2058-7058/20/11/39.
- Glatzel, P.; Bergmann, U. (2005). "High resolution 1s core hole x-ray spectroscopy in 3d transition metal complexes – Electronic and Structural Information". Coordination Chemistry Reviews. 249 (1–2): 65–95. doi:10.1016/j.ccr.2004.04.011.
- Wernet, Ph.; et al. (2004). "The Structure of the First Coordination Shell in Liquid Water". Science. 304 (5673): 995–999. doi:10.1126/science.1096205.
- Bergmann, U.; et al. (1999). "Dependence of Interatomic X-Ray Transition Energies and Intensities – A Study of Mn Kβ'' and Kβ2,5 Spectra". Chemical Physics Letters. 302 (1–2): 119–124. doi:10.1016/S0009-2614(99)00095-0.
- Hastings, J. B.; et al. (1991). "Mössbauer Spectroscopy using Synchrotron Radiation". Physical Review Letters. 66 (6): 770–773. doi:10.1103/PhysRevLett.66.770.
