= K-edge =

Sudden increase in x-ray absorption

In X-ray absorption spectroscopy, the K-edge is a sudden increase in x-ray absorption occurring when the energy of the X-rays is just above the binding energy of the innermost electron shell of the atoms interacting with the photons. The term is based on X-ray notation, where the innermost electron shell is known as the K-shell. Physically, this sudden increase in attenuation is caused by the photoelectric absorption of the photons. For this interaction to occur, the photons must have more energy than the binding energy of the K-shell electrons (K-edge). A photon having an energy just above the binding energy of the electron is therefore more likely to be absorbed than a photon having an energy just below this binding energy or significantly above it.

The energies near the K-edge are also objects of study, and provide other information.

== Use ==
The two radiocontrast agents iodine and barium have ideal K-shell binding energies for absorption of X-rays: 33.2 keV and 37.4 keV respectively, which is close to the mean energy of most diagnostic X-ray beams. Similar sudden increases in attenuation may also be found for other inner shells than the K shell; the general term for the phenomenon is absorption edge.

Dual-energy computed tomography techniques take advantage of the increased attenuation of iodinated radiocontrast at lower tube energies to heighten the degree of contrast between iodinated radiocontrast and other high attenuation biological material present in the body such as blood and hemorrhage.

== Metal K-edge ==
Metal K-edge spectroscopy is a spectroscopic technique used to study the electronic structures of transition metal atoms and complexes. This method measures X-ray absorption caused by the excitation of a 1s electron to valence bound states localized on the metal, which creates a characteristic absorption peak called the K-edge. The K-edge can be divided into the pre-edge region (comprising the pre-edge and rising edge transitions) and the near-edge region (comprising the intense edge transition and ~150 eV above it).

=== Pre-edge ===
The K-edge of an open shell transition metal ion displays a weak pre-edge 1s-to-valence-metal-d transition at a lower energy than the intense edge jump. This dipole-forbidden transition gains intensity through a quadrupole mechanism and/or through 4p mixing into the final state. The pre-edge contains information about ligand fields and oxidation state. Higher oxidation of the metal leads to greater stabilization of the 1s orbital with respect to the metal d orbitals, resulting in higher energy of the pre-edge. Bonding interactions with ligands also cause changes in the metal's effective nuclear charge (Z_{eff}), leading to changes in the energy of the pre-edge.

The intensity under the pre-edge transition depends on the geometry around the absorbing metal and can be correlated to the structural symmetry in the molecule. Molecules with centrosymmetry have low pre-edge intensity, whereas the intensity increases as the molecule moves away from centrosymmetry. This change is due to the higher mixing of the 4p with the 3d orbitals as the molecule loses centrosymmetry.

=== Rising-edge ===
A rising-edge follows the pre-edge, and may consist of several overlapping transitions that are hard to resolve. The energy position of the rising-edge contains information about the oxidation state of the metal.

In the case of copper complexes, the rising-edge consists of intense transitions, which provide information about bonding. For Cu^{I} species, this transition is a distinct shoulder and arises from intense electric-dipole-allowed 1s→4p transitions. The normalized intensity and energy of the rising-edge transitions in these Cu^{I} complexes can be used to distinguish between two-, three- and four-coordinate Cu^{I} sites. In the case of higher-oxidation-state copper atoms, the 1s→4p transition lies higher in energy, mixed in with the near-edge region. However, an intense transition in the rising-edge region is observed for Cu^{III} and some Cu^{II} complexes from a formally forbidden two electron 1s→4p+shakedown transition. This “shakedown” process arises from a 1s→4p transition that leads to relaxation of the excited state, followed by a ligand-to-metal charge transfer to the excited state.

This rising-edge transition can be fitted to a valence bond configuration (VBCI) model to obtain the composition of the ground state wavefunction and information on ground state covalency. The VBCI model describes the ground and excited state as a linear combination of the metal-based d-state and the ligand-based charge transfer state. The higher the contribution of the charge transfer state to the ground state, the higher is the ground state covalency indicating stronger metal-ligand bonding.

=== Near-edge ===
The near-edge region is difficult to quantitatively analyze because it describes transitions to continuum levels that are still under the influence of the core potential. This region is analogous to the EXAFS region and contains structural information. Extraction of metrical parameters from the edge region can be obtained by using the multiple-scattering code implemented in the MXAN software.

== Ligand K-edge ==
Ligand K-edge spectroscopy is a spectroscopic technique used to study the electronic structures of metal-ligand complexes. This method measures X-ray absorption caused by the excitation of ligand 1s electrons to unfilled p orbitals (principal quantum number $n \leq 4$) and continuum states, which creates a characteristic absorption feature called the K-edge.

=== Pre-edges ===
Transitions at energies lower than the edge can occur, provided they lead to orbitals with some ligand p character; these features are called pre-edges. Pre-edge intensities (D_{0}) are related to the amount of ligand (L) character in the unfilled orbital:

$$D_0(L \ 1s \rightarrow \psi^*) = const \ \vert \langle L \ 1s \vert \mathbf{r} \vert \psi^* \rangle \vert^2
= \alpha^2 \ const \ \vert \langle L \ 1s \vert \mathbf{r} \vert L \ np \rangle \vert^2$$

where $\psi^*$ is the wavefunction of the unfilled orbital, r is the transition dipole operator, and $\alpha^2$ is the "covalency" or ligand character in the orbital. Since $\psi^* = \sqrt{1-\alpha^2} \vert M_d \rangle - \alpha \vert L_{np} \rangle$, the above expression relating intensity and quantum transition operators can be simplified to use experimental values:

$$D_0 = \frac{\alpha^2 h}{3n}I_s$$

where n is the number of absorbing ligand atoms, h is the number of holes, and I_{s} is the transition dipole integral which can be determined experimentally. Therefore, by measuring the intensity of pre-edges, it is possible to experimentally determine the amount of ligand character in a molecular orbital.

== See also ==
- Metal L-edge
- Extended X-ray absorption fine structure
