= FitIt =

FitIt is graphical software to fit X-ray absorption near edge structure (XANES). It can be used to determine the values of local atomic structure parameters on the basis of minimization between theoretical and experimental spectra. It is the program for the fitting and therefore it always uses external programs, for example FEFF8 or FDMNES, for fixed geometry calculations of XANES. In order to minimize the number of such calculations, which can be very time-consuming, multidimensional interpolation algorithm is implemented into the FitIt. Such approach has allowed also to develop visual control of the fitting procedure and it is possible to vary structural parameters by sliders and immediately see the theoretical spectrum corresponding to these structural parameters. The program is free of charge for non-commercial research and educational purposes.

PyFitIt python implementation of FitIt software was extended with additional features: Machine learning, automatic component analysis, direct geometry prediction and others. It uses ipywidgets to construct the portable GUI, supports different types of interpolation point generation (grid, random, IHS).
