= PARATEC =

PARATEC (PARAllel Total Energy Code) is a package that performs ab initio quantum mechanical total energy calculations using pseudopotentials and a plane wave basis set. PARATEC is designed primarily for a massively parallel computing platform, and can run on serial machines. Calculations of XANES within such a full-potential approach has been implemented within PARATEC.

The total energy minimization of the electrons can be done by two methods: (i) the more traditional self-consistent field (SCF) method and (ii) direct minimization (currently only implemented for systems with a gap) of the total energy.
