= Metal L-edge =

Spectroscopic technique

Figure 1: L_{3}- and L_{2}-edges of [CuCl_{4}]^{2−}.

Metal L-edge spectroscopy is a spectroscopic technique used to study the electronic structures of transition metal atoms and complexes. This method measures X-ray absorption caused by the excitation of a metal 2p electron to unfilled d orbitals (e.g. 3d for first-row transition metals), which creates a characteristic absorption peak called the L-edge. Similar features can also be studied by Electron Energy Loss Spectroscopy. According to the selection rules, the transition is formally electric-dipole allowed, which not only makes it more intense than an electric-dipole forbidden metal K pre-edge (1s → 3d) transition, but also makes it more feature-rich as the lower required energy (~400-1000 eV from scandium to copper) results in a higher-resolution experiment.

In the simplest case, that of a cupric (Cu^{II}) complex, the 2p → 3d transition produces a 2p^{5}3d^{10} final state. The 2p^{5} core hole created in the transition has an orbital angular momentum L=1 which then couples to the spin angular momentum S=1/2 to produce J=3/2 and J=1/2 final states. These states are directly observable in the L-edge spectrum as the two main peaks (Figure 1). The peak at lower energy (~930 eV) has the greatest intensity and is called the L_{3}-edge, while the peak at higher energy (~950 eV) has less intensity and is called the L_{2}-edge.

== Spectral components ==
Figure 2: L-edge spectral components.

As we move left across the periodic table (e.g. from copper to iron), we create additional holes in the metal 3d orbitals. For example, a low-spin ferric (Fe^{III}) system in an octahedral environment has a ground state of (t_{2g})^{5}(e_{g})^{0} resulting in transitions to the t_{2g} (dπ) and e_{g} (dσ) sets. Therefore, there are two possible final states: t_{2g}^{6}e_{g}^{0} or t_{2g}^{5}e_{g}^{1}(Figure 2a). Since the ground-state metal configuration has four holes in the e_{g} orbital set and one hole in the t_{2g} orbital set, an intensity ratio of 4:1 might be expected (Figure 2b). However, this model does not take into account covalent bonding and, indeed, an intensity ratio of 4:1 is not observed in the spectrum.

In the case of iron, the d^{6} excited state will further split in energy due to d-d electron repulsion (Figure 2c). This splitting is given by the right-hand (high-field) side of the d^{6} Tanabe–Sugano diagram and can be mapped onto a theoretical simulation of a L-edge spectrum (Figure 2d). Other factors such as p-d electron repulsion and spin-orbit coupling of the 2p and 3d electrons must also be considered to fully simulate the data.

For a ferric system, all of these effects result in 252 initial states and 1260 possible final states that together will comprise the final L-edge spectrum (Figure 2e). Despite all of these possible states, it has been established that in a low-spin ferric system, the lowest energy peak is due to a transition to the t_{2g} hole and the more intense and higher energy (~3.5 eV) peak is to that of the unoccupied e_{g} orbitals.

== Feature mixing ==
Figure 3: Configurations involved in the ground and excited states and the mechanisms by which the intensity of the L-edge features can mix.

In most systems, bonding between a ligand and a metal atom can be thought of in terms of metal-ligand covalent bonds, where the occupied ligand orbitals donate some electron density to the metal. This is commonly known as ligand-to-metal charge transfer or LMCT. In some cases, low-lying unoccupied ligand orbitals (π*) can receive back-donation (or backbonding) from the occupied metal orbitals. This has the opposite effect on the system, resulting in metal-to-ligand charge transfer, MLCT, and commonly appears as an additional L-edge spectral feature.

An example of this feature occurs in low-spin ferric [Fe(CN)_{6}]^{3−}, since CN^{−} is a ligand that can have backbonding. While backbonding is important in the initial state, it would only warrant a small feature in the L-edge spectrum. In fact, it is in the final state where the backbonding π* orbitals are allowed to mix with the very intense e_{g} transition, thus borrowing intensity and resulting in the final dramatic three peak spectrum (Figure 3 and Figure 4).

== Model construction ==
Figure 4: Comparison of the Fe L-edges of low-spin K_{3}[Fe(CN)_{6}] and [Fe(tacn)_{2}]Cl_{3}. Tacn is a σ-only donor, meaning no backbonding and only two main L-edge features. K_{3}[Fe(CN)_{6}] has significant backbonding, as is shown by the third transition to higher energy in the L-edge spectrum.

X-ray absorption spectroscopy (XAS), like other spectroscopies, looks at the excited state to infer information about the ground state. To make a quantitative assignment, L-edge data is fitted using a valence bond configuration interaction (VBCI) model where LMCT and MLCT are applied as needed to successfully simulate the observed spectral features. These simulations are then further compared to density functional theory (DFT) calculations to arrive at a final interpretation of the data and an accurate description of the electronic structure of the complex (Figure 4).

In the case of iron L-edge, the excited state mixing of the metal e_{g} orbitals into the ligand π* make this method a direct and very sensitive probe of backbonding.

== See also ==
- Metal K-edge
- Ligand K-edge
- Extended X-ray absorption fine structure
