= AAAS Philip Hauge Abelson Prize =

American award

- Description: Award recognizing public servants for sustained exceptional contributions to advancing science, distinguished scientific achievement, and notable services to the scientific community
- Country: United States
- Presented by: American Association for the Advancement of Science (AAAS)

The AAAS Philip Hauge Abelson Prize is awarded by The American Association for the Advancement of Science for public servants, recognized for sustained exceptional contributions to advancing science or scientists, whose career has been distinguished both for scientific achievement and for other notable services to the scientific community. The prize is named after nuclear physicist Philip Abelson.The award consists of an engraved medallion and an honorarium of $5,000.

== Recipients ==
| Year | Recipient | References |
|---|---|---|
| 1990 | George E. Brown, Jr | |
| 1991 | Bentley Glass | |
| 1992 | John H. Gibbons | |
| 1993 | Harvey Brooks | |
| 1994 | Frank Press | |
| 1995 | William O. Baker | |
| 1996 | D. Allan Bromley | |
| 1997 | Peter H. Raven | |
| 1998 | Mary L. Good | |
| 1999 | Neal F. Lane | |
| 2000 | Leon M. Lederman | |
| 2001 | Norman E. Borlaug | |
| 2002 | Vernon J. Ehlers | |
| 2003 | Norman P. Neureiter | |
| 2004 | Maxine Frank Singer | |
| 2005 | Norman R. Augustine | |
| 2006 | Charles M. Vest | |
| 2007 | Burton Richter | |
| 2008 | Richard A. Meserve | |
| 2009 | Francis S. Collins | |
| 2010 | Rush Holt | |
| 2011 | Shirley Ann Jackson | |
| 2012 | Anita K. Jones | |
| 2013 | Lewis M. Branscomb | |
| 2014 | Bruce Alberts | |
| 2015 | Eric Lander | |
| 2016 | Ioannis Miaoulis | |
| 2018 | Arthur Bienenstock | |
| 2019 | Cato T. Laurencin | |
| 2020 | Chad Mirkin | |
| 2021 | Anthony S. Fauci | |
| 2022 | Margaret A. Hamburg | |
| 2023 | Sekazi Kauze Mtingwa | |
| 2024 | Joel R. Primack | |
| 2025 | Mary Woolley (scientist) | |
| 2026 | Gilbert S. Omenn | |

== See also ==
- AAAS Award for Science Diplomacy
- AAAS Award for Scientific Freedom and Responsibility
- AAAS Prize for Behavioral Science Research
- Newcomb Cleveland Prize
