= Paul McIntyre (scientist) =

Nanotechnologist

Paul C. McIntyre is a Canadian-American Rick and Melinda Reed Professor, Director of Stanford Synchrotron Radiation Lightsource, and Senior Fellow at the Precourt Institute for Energy. He served as Department Chair in the Department of Materials Science and Engineering at Stanford University from 2014 to 2019. McIntyre is well known for his research in atomic layer deposition for high-κ dielectrics, semiconductor/oxide interfaces, and thin film applications. He received his Sc.D. from MIT in 1993. He has won the IBM Faculty Award and was a Charles Lee Powell Foundation Scholar.
