= Dirk Coster =

Dutch physicist (1889–1950)

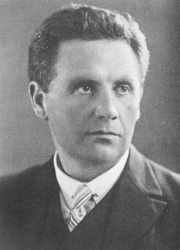
- Coster in 1930
- Born: 5 October 1889; Amsterdam, Netherlands
- Died: 12 February 1950 (aged 60); Groningen, Netherlands
- Education: Leiden University
- Known for: Discovery of hafnium Coster–Kronig transition
- Children: 4
- Scientific career
- Fields: Physics; X-ray spectroscopy
- Workplaces: University of Groningen
- Thesis: Röntgenspectra en de atoomtheorie van Bohr (1922)
- Doctoral advisor: Paul Ehrenfest
- Notable students: Aldert van der Ziel; Hessel de Vries

Dirk Coster (5 October 1889 – 12 February 1950) was a Dutch physicist. He was a professor of physics and meteorology at the University of Groningen.

Coster is known as the co-discoverer of hafnium (element 72) in 1923, along with George de Hevesy, by means of X-ray spectroscopic analysis of zirconium ore. Its name is derived from Hafnia, the Latin name for Copenhagen, as the discovery took place in that city.

He helped Lise Meitner escape from Nazi Germany.

== Childhood and education ==
Coster was born in Amsterdam. Coster grew up in a large working-class family; he was the third child of Barend Coster, a blacksmith, and Aafje van der Mik. The Coster family valued education. Ten of their children survived to adulthood and all received enough education to go on to middle-class professions. From 1904 to 1908 Dirk went to the Teacher's College in Haarlem, then was a teacher until 1913. With the aid of private support he was able to study mathematics and physics at the University of Leiden, first having passed the exams required for students who had no gymnasium education. In Leiden he was influenced by the inspiring lectures of Paul Ehrenfest, and in 1916 he obtained his M.Sc. degree. From 1916 to 1920 Coster was assistant of Lodewijk Siertsema and Wander de Haas at the Delft University of Technology, where in 1919 he obtained an Engineer's degree in electrical engineering. In 1920 and 1921 he did research at Lund University under Manne Siegbahn, on X-ray spectroscopy of different elements. Coster's thesis was on this subject, and he obtained his Ph.D. degree in 1922 in Leiden under Paul Ehrenfest; his thesis was entitled "Röntgenspectra en de atoomtheorie van Bohr" (X-ray spectra and Bohr's atomic theory).

== Academic career ==
From August 1922 until the summer of 1923, Coster worked in Niels Bohr's Institute in Copenhagen. Within a few months he co-authored a landmark publication with Bohr, on X-ray spectroscopy and the periodic system of the elements. In addition he worked with chemist George de Hevesy on the identification of element number 72. Element 72 had been known to be a gap in the sequence of elements since 1914, when Henry Moseley created an experimental technique for placing the elements in a definite sequence. Radiochemist Fritz Paneth suggested that element 72 might be found in ores of zirconium. Niels Bohr published a prediction of the electronic configuration of element 72 in 1923. von Hevesy had been working with Bohr at the time.

After Coster returned from Copenhagen he became Hendrik Lorentz' assistant at the Teylers Museum in Haarlem, where he developed an X-ray spectrometer. In 1924 he was appointed at the University of Groningen, where he was the successor of Wander de Haas. At Groningen he started an active research program in X-ray spectroscopy.

In 1934 Coster became member of the Royal Netherlands Academy of Arts and Sciences.

== Personal life ==
On 26 February 1919 he married Lina Maria "Miep" Wijsman, who held a degree in Oriental languages. Eventually, she was one of the first women to obtain a doctorate degree in this field from the University of Leiden. Dirk and Miep had two sons and two daughters (Hendrik, Ada, Els, and Herman).

== Later years ==
Coster was politically involved. In 1938 he traveled to Berlin to convince Lise Meitner that she had to leave Germany to escape the persecution of the Jews. Together they went by train to Groningen; at the Dutch border, Coster persuaded German immigration officers that she had permission to travel to the Netherlands. From there she went on to Sweden by way of Copenhagen. During the German occupation of Holland, Coster also helped Jews hide from the Nazis and listened to the BBC on a daily basis using a bicycle-powered radio.

Dirk Coster died in Groningen in 1950.

== Honors and awards ==
The asteroid 10445 Coster is named after Dirk Coster.

== Publications ==
- Coster, D (July 1923). "Röntgenspektren und Bohrsche Atomtheorie". Naturwissenschaften. 11 (27): 567–577. Bibcode:1923NW.....11..567C. doi:10.1007/BF01554353. ISSN 0028-1042. S2CID 32356298.
- Bohr, N; Coster, D (December 1923). "Röntgenspektren und periodisches System der Elemente". Zeitschrift für Physik A. 12 (1): 342–374. Bibcode:1923ZPhy...12..342B. doi:10.1007/BF01328104. ISSN 0939-7922. S2CID 120877752.
- Coster, D; von Hevesey, G (20 January 1923). "On the missing element of atomic number 72". Nature. 111 (2777): 79. Bibcode:1923Natur.111...79C. doi:10.1038/111079a0.
- Coster, D; de Laer Kronig, R (1935). "A new type of Auger effect and its influence on the x-ray spectrum". Physica. 2 (1): 13–24. Bibcode:1935Phy.....2...13C. doi:10.1016/S0031-8914(35)90060-X.

== See also ==
- Hafnium
- Coster–Kronig transition
- X-ray spectroscopy
- Auger effect

== References and further reading ==
- Scerri, Eric R. (March 1994). "Prediction of the nature of hafnium from chemistry, Bohr's theory and quantum theory". Annals of Science. 51 (2): 137–150. doi:10.1080/00033799400200161.
- Lewin Sime, Ruth (1996). Lise Meitner: A Life in Physics. University of California Press. pp. 184–209, Chapter Eight: Escape. ISBN 978-0-520-20860-5.
- Heisenberg's War: The Secret History of the German Bomb by Thomas Powers (Da Capo Press, 2000 ) ISBN 0-306-81011-5.
- No Time to Be Brief: A Scientific Biography of Wolfgang Pauli by Charles P. Enz (Oxford University Press, 2002) ISBN 0-19-856479-1.
