= Stanford Synchrotron Radiation Lightsource =

Research center at Stanford University

Coordinates: 37°25′06.2″N 122°12′03.5″W

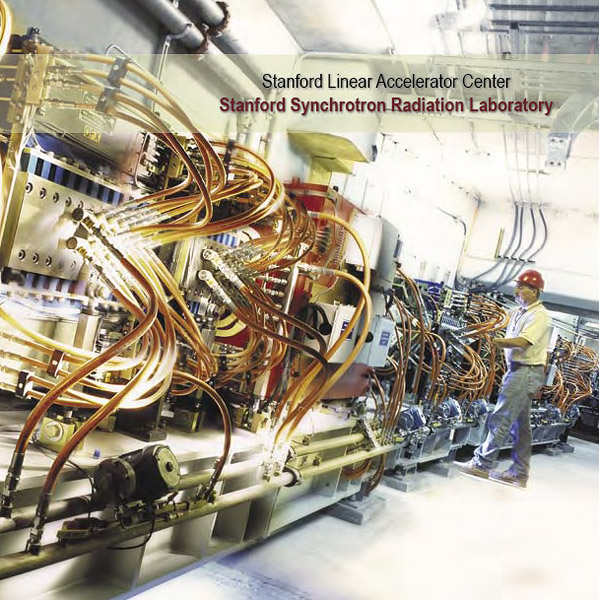
Photograph inside the SSRL accelerator ring.

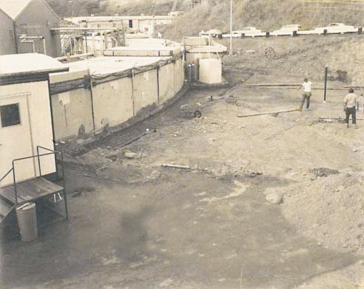
Historic SSRL 1972. First x-ray beamline.

The Stanford Synchrotron Radiation Lightsource (formerly Stanford Synchrotron Radiation Laboratory), a division of SLAC National Accelerator Laboratory, is operated by Stanford University for the Department of Energy. SSRL is a National User Facility which provides synchrotron radiation, a name given to electromagnetic radiation in the x-ray, ultraviolet, visible and infrared realms produced by electrons circulating in a storage ring (Stanford Positron Electron Asymmetric Ring - SPEAR) at nearly the speed of light. The extremely bright light that is produced can be used to investigate various forms of matter ranging from objects of atomic and molecular size to man-made materials with unusual properties. The obtained information and knowledge is of great value to society, with impact in areas such as the environment, future technologies, health, biology, basic research, and education.

SSRL provides experimental facilities to some 2,000 academic and industrial scientists working in such varied fields as drug design, environmental cleanup, electronics, and x-ray imaging. It is located in San Mateo County, in the city of Menlo Park, California, close to the Stanford University main campus.

== History ==
In 1972, the first x-ray beamline was constructed by Ingolf Lindau and Piero Pianetta as literally a "hole in the wall" extending off of the SPEAR storage ring. SPEAR had been built in an era of particle colliders, where physicists were more interested in smashing particles together in hope of discovering antimatter than in using x-ray radiation for solid state physics and chemistry. From those meager beginnings the Stanford Synchrotron Radiation Project (SSRP) began. Within a short time SSRP had five experimental hutches that each used the radiation originating from only one of the large SPEAR dipole (bending) magnets. Each one of those stations was equipped with a monochromator to select the radiation of interest, and experimenters would bring their samples and end stations from all over the world to study the unique effects only achieved through synchrotron radiation. The SLAC 2-mile linear accelerator was the original source for 3GeV electrons, but by 1991 SPEAR had its own 3-section linac and energy-ramping booster ring. Today, the SPEAR storage ring is dedicated completely to the Stanford Synchrotron Radiation Lightsource as part of the SLAC National Accelerator Laboratory facility. SSRL currently operates 24/7 for about nine months each year; the remaining time is used for major maintenance and upgrades where direct access to the storage ring is needed. There are currently 17 beamlines and over 30 unique experimental stations which are made available to users from universities, government labs, and industry from all over the world.

== Directors ==
1. Sebastian Doniach 1973-1977
2. Arthur Bienenstock 1978-1998
3. Keith Hodgson 1998-2005
4. Joachim Stöhr 2005-2009
5. Piero Pianetta 2009
6. Chi-Chang Kao 2010-2012
7. Piero Pianetta 2012-2014
8. Kelly Gaffney 2014-2019
9. Paul McIntyre 2019-present

== Facilities ==
listed by Beamline and Station

- BL 7-3, 9-3, 4-3 These three beamlines are dedicated to biological x-ray absorption spectroscopy. Beamline 7-3 is an unfocused beamline and thus is best suited for XAS on dilute protein samples. Beamline 9-3 has an additional upstream focusing mirror, over 7-3, making it the preferred choice for photo reducing samples or ones where multiple different spots are needed. Beamline 4-3 was newly reopened as of 4/6/2009 bringing special capabilities for soft-energy (2.4-6 keV) studies in addition to hard x-rays. Beamline 4-3 now replaces 6-2 as the preferred location for Sulfur K-edge experiments at SSRL.
- BL 6-2 With three upstream mirrors, two for focusing and a third for harmonic rejection, this beamline has become dedicated to transmission x-ray microscopy in the 4-12 keV range, soft x-ray absorption spectroscopy including Rapid-scanning xRF imaging, and advanced spectroscopy such as XES (resonant and non-resonant x-ray emission spectroscopy), XRS (non-resonant x-ray Raman scattering and RIXS (resonant inelastic X-ray scattering).
- BL 8-2, 10-1, 13-2 These three beamlines are specialized for soft x-ray absorption spectroscopy, including NEXAFS (Near edge X-ray absorption fine structure), some light atom Ligand K-edge (carbon, nitrogen, oxygen, chlorine), PES (Photoemission spectroscopy), and L-edge measurements. All experiments on these beamlines require special handling and advanced ultra high vacuum experience and techniques.
- BL 11-3 Materials Science Scattering, Reflectivity and Single Crystal Diffraction Experiments. Uses to date include: study of structure in organic, metal, and semiconductor thin films and multilayers; study of charge-density waves in rare earth tri-tellurides; study of in-situ growth of biogenic minerals; partial determination of texture in recrystallized pumice; quick determination of single crystal orientation.
- BL 1-5, 7-1, 9-1, 9-2, 11-1, 11-3, 12-2 These beamlines are used for macromolecular x-ray crystallography. All of the beamlines are for general use, except for beamline 12-2, which was funded in part by Caltech via a gift from the Gordon and Betty Moore Foundation. As a result, 40% of beamtime on 12-2 is reserved for Caltech researchers.
- BL 4-2 Biological small-angle X-ray scattering beamline.
