= Arthur Bienenstock =

American academic (born 1935)

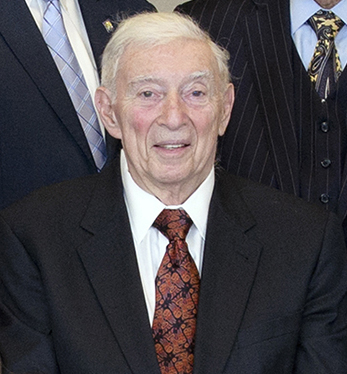
- Bienenstock at 2017 National Science Board
- Born: 1935
- Scientific career
- Fields: Physics

Arthur Bienenstock (born 1935) is a professor emeritus of Photon Science at Stanford University. He is also a member of the National Science Board.

He received his B.S. in 1955 and M.S. in 1957 from the Polytechnic Institute of Brooklyn, and a Ph.D. in 1962 from Harvard University. He was the former director of the Stanford Synchrotron Radiation Lightsource from 1978 to 1998.

He was vice provost and dean of research at Stanford University from 2003 until 2006.

He is a former president of the American Physical Society, serving in that role in 2008, and was a recipient of the 2018 AAAS Philip Hauge Abelson Prize.
