= FEFF (software) =

FEFF is a software program used in x-ray absorption spectroscopy. It contains self-consistent real space multiple-scattering code for simultaneous calculations of x-ray-absorption spectra and electronic structure. Output includes extended x-ray-absorption fine structure (EXAFS), full multiple scattering calculations of various x-ray absorption spectra (XAS) and projected local densities of states (LDOS). The spectra include x-ray absorption near edge structure (XANES), x-ray natural circular dichroism (XNCD), and non-resonant x-ray emission spectra. Calculations of the x-ray scattering amplitude (Thomson and anomalous parts) and spin dependent calculations of x-ray magnetic circular dichroism (XMCD) and spin polarized x-ray absorption spectra (SPXAS and SPEXAFS) are also possible, but less automated.

The most recent version of FEFF is FEFF10, released in 2020.

== Uses ==
FEFF is used as external program to calculate basic spectra for XANES fitting using FitIt.

Atomic scattering amplitudes and phase shifts are used for EXAFS fitting in IFEFFIT program suite.
