= Helen Rehr =

- Born: December 16, 1919; New York City
- Died: February 13, 2013 (aged 93); New York City
- Occupation: professor of social work
- Years active: 1954–2013
- Known for: Director of the Department of Social Work at Mount Sinai Hospital

Helen Rehr (December 16, 1919 – February 13, 2013) was an American medical social worker, director of the Department of Social Work at Mount Sinai Hospital in New York.

== Early life ==
Helen Rehr was born in New York, the daughter of Philip Rehr and Rose Rehr. Both of her parents were born in Poland. She attended Hunter College for undergraduate studies, before earning a master's degree from Columbia University School of Social Work (CUSSW) in 1945; she completed a doctorate there in 1970.

== Career ==
Rehr joined the social work department of Mount Sinai Hospital in 1954, and retired as the department's director in 1986. She helped establish international exchanges for social work scholarship, and helped create the International Conference on Social Work in Health and Mental Health. She was on faculty at Mount Sinai School of Medicine and Medical Center, where she was director of the Academic Division of Social Work. Rehr had more than a hundred scholarly publications. She was a member of the editorial board for the journal Social Work in Health Care from its founding in 1975, and was a visiting professor at the University of Pennsylvania (1978–1979), Ben-Gurion University of the Negev and Hebrew University of Jerusalem (1986).

Academic and professional honors accorded to Rehr included the CUSSW Distinguished Service Alumni Medal in 2004; the "Social Work Pioneer" designation by the National Association of Social Workers Foundation; the Ida M. Cannon Award in 1975, induction into the Hunter College Hall of Fame, and into the Columbia University School of Social Work Hall of Fame. She was a fellow of the New York Academy of Medicine.

== Personal life and legacy ==
Rehr died in 2013, aged 93 years, at her home in New York City. She established both the Helen Rehr Scholarship Fund and the Helen Rehr and Ruth Fizdale Professorship Fund in Health and Mental Health, both at CUSSW. The Helen Rehr Center for Social Work Practice was founded in 2010.
