= Ralph Kronig =

German physicist (1904–1995)

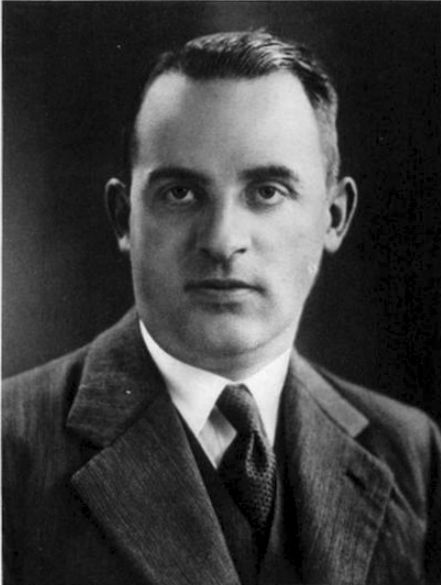
- Born: 10 March 1904; Dresden, Saxony
- Died: 16 November 1995 (aged 91); Zeist, Netherlands
- Citizenship: United States; Germany
- Education: Columbia University
- Known for: Discovery of particle spin Kronig structure Kronig–Penney model Coster–Kronig transition Kramers–Kronig relations
- Awards: Max Planck Medal (1962)
- Scientific career
- Workplaces: Columbia University; TU Delft
- Doctoral advisor: Albert Potter Wills
- Other academic advisors: Wolfgang Pauli

Signature
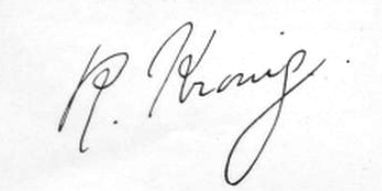

Ralph Kronig (10 March 1904 – 16 November 1995) was a German physicist. He is noted for the discovery of particle spin and for his theory of X-ray absorption spectroscopy. His theories include the Kronig–Penney model, the Coster–Kronig transition and the Kramers–Kronig relations.

== Background ==
Ralph Kronig (later Ralph de Laer Kronig) was born on 10 March 1904 to German parents (Harold Theodor Kronig, Augusta de Laer) in Dresden, Germany. He died in Zeist on 16 November 1995 at the age of 91. Kronig received his primary and high-school education in Dresden and went to New York City to study at Columbia University where he received his PhD in 1925 and subsequently became instructor (1925) and assistant professor (1927).

Early in Kronig's career he met Paul Ehrenfest who, while visiting America in 1924, advised Ralph Kronig to revisit Europe, which Kronig did later the same year. He paid visits to the important centers for theoretical-physics research in Germany and Copenhagen. It was a time of great expansion in the development of quantum mechanics, and this development was mostly happening in Europe at the time.

In January 1925, when Kronig was still a Columbia University PhD student, he first proposed the electron spin after hearing Pauli in Tübingen. Heisenberg and Pauli immediately hated the idea. They had just ruled out all imaginable actions from quantum mechanics. Pauli especially ridiculed the idea of spin, saying that "it is indeed very clever but of course has nothing to do with reality". Faced with such criticism, Kronig decided not to publish his theory and the idea of electron spin had to wait for others to take the credit. Ralph Kronig had come up with the idea of electron spin several months before George Uhlenbeck and Samuel Goudsmit. Most textbooks credit these two Dutch physicists with the discovery. Ralph Kronig did not hold a grudge against Pauli for this turn of events. In fact, Kronig and Pauli remained friends for many years into the future. They exchanged many ideas in physics through letters. But it remains an historic fact that Kronig had told Pauli about electron spin before Pauli had published his paper showing that two electrons can inhabit the same orbital (W. Pauli, "On the Connexion between the Completion of Electron Groups in an Atom with the Complex Structure of Spectra", Z. Physik 31, 765ff, 1925). Months later when Uhlenbeck and Goudsmit came up with particle spin, it seemed to verify Pauli's paper. Together with Isidor Isaac Rabi, Kronig gave the first solution (1927) of the Schrödinger equation for the rigid symmetric top.

Werner Heisenberg in developing quantum mechanics involved Kronig in his seminal ideas of the theory. In the beginning of May 1925, Heisenberg wrote three times to Ralph Kronig, with whom he had cooperated a little earlier in Copenhagen on the spectral theory of multi-electron atoms. In the second letter, dated 5 May, Heisenberg wrote down in some detailed equations expressing the transition to his matrix mechanics.

In 1927, Kronig returned to Europe for good and worked in different prominent centres of research: Copenhagen, London, Zürich (where for a year he was Pauli's assistant). Around 1930 he settled in the Netherlands: first in Utrecht, then in Groningen, first as Dirk Coster's assistant, and from 1931 as an associate professor, and since 1939 as a full professor at the Delft University of Technology where he stayed until his retirement in 1969. Between 1959 and 1962 he was the rector of the university. He was recognized internationally by then as a renowned theorist who corresponded with the leading characters of that time and made interesting contributions to quantum mechanics and the application of it particularly on the physics of molecules and molecular spectra, an area on which he was the expert of those days. The Max Planck medal was awarded to Ralph Kronig in 1962.

Kronig was elected a member of the Royal Netherlands Academy of Arts and Sciences in 1946, in 1969 he became a foreign member.

Among Ralph Kronig's substantial correspondence are many letters to and from the 20th century's greatest physicists that should be preserved for posterity and Kronig himself published many in books.

Showing Kronig's great respect for Pauli, in one letter Ralph Kronig said regarding Pauli and the slim number of actual publications made by Pauli considering the extent of his work [translated from the German]:

... his [Pauli's] publications contain however, which is understandable due to Pauli's unusually critical attitude, only a small part of the work really carried out by him. Pauli briefs in his papers on the finished results, but not on the long, often laborious way, which had led to them, and also not on incomplete attempts. A part of his work is only carried in a satisfying way in his extensive exchange of letters

Stumm von Bordwehr (1989) gives a detailed description of the life and accomplishments of Kronig, even recounting how his name was changed to Ralph de Laer Kronig.

== Scientific achievement ==
Ralph Kronig (1931, 1932), published the first theory of x-ray absorption fine structure, which contained some of the basic concepts of the modern interpretation. The Kronig-Penney model (1931) is a one-dimensional model of a crystal that shows how the electrons in a crystal are dispersed into allowed and forbidden bands by scattering from the extended linear array of atoms. His first theory (1931) of extended X-ray absorption fine structure (EXAFS) was the three-dimensional equivalent of this model. The theory showed that a photo electron traversing a crystal lattice would experience permitted and forbidden zones depending on its wavelength and, that even when the effect was averaged over all directions in the lattice, a residual structure should be observed. His theory was successful in predicting many generally observed features of the fine structure, including similar structure from similar lattices, inverse r^{2} dependence, correct r versus T dependence and increasing energy separation of the fine structure features with energy from the edge. The equation, which was re-derived in a more quantitative way in 1932 was simple to apply and interpret. Every experimenter found approximate agreement with the theory. There were always some absorption features close to that predicted by the possible lattice planes. However, the expected strong reflections (e. g. (100), (110), (111), etc. ) did not always correlate with the most intense absorption features as intuitively expected. Still, agreement was close enough to be tantalizing and everyone tested the agreement of their measured "Kronig structure" with the simple Kronig theory. In the Kronig equation, energy positions W_{n} correspond to the zone boundaries, i. e. not the absorption maxima or minima, but the first rise in each fine structure maximum. abg are the Miller indices, a is the lattice constant and q is the angle between the electron direction and the reciprocal lattice direction. When averaged over all directions with a non-polarized x-ray beam and a polycrystalline absorber, cos 2q = 1. However, with a single crystal absorber and polarized X-rays the absorption features should be larger for specific crystal planes. This was another experimental variable that might verify the theory and many attempted to test it. Thus began the long record of publications in which Kronig structure was interpreted in terms of the simple Kronig theory. Until the 1970s fully 2% of the papers published in Phys. Rev. were devoted to x-ray absorption spectroscopy and most invoked Kronig's theory.

The short range order data of Hanawalt (1931b) stimulated Kronig (1932) to develop a theory for molecules. This model served as the starting point for all the subsequent short range order theories but few attempted to compare it to their data. Kronig's student, H. Petersen (1932, 1933) continued this work. Peterson's equation shows many of the features of the modern theory. This theory was applied to GeCl_{4} by Hartree, Kronig and Petersen (1934). A description of the Herculean efforts required to perform the calculations can be found in Stumm von Bordwehr (1989).

The Kramers–Kronig relation for dispersion was derived by Kronig (1926) independently of Kramers (1927). Any satisfactory theory of dispersion must comply with the condition that the scattered wave can never appear in advance of the incident wave that produces it. Hans Kramers and Kronig showed that this basic causality condition implies that the dispersion (i.e., the variation of refractive index with frequency) and the absorption are not independent. They derived equations enabling the absorption to be calculated when the dispersion is known (for all frequencies) and vice versa. It is not surprising that a relationship should exist, because dispersion and absorption are each related to the resonators described above in connection with scattering by bound electrons. The relationship has been found of great importance in many branches of pure and applied physics.

== Books published by Ralph Kronig ==
- Correspondence with Niels Bohr, 1924–1953.
- Textbook of physics. Under the editorship of R. Kronig in collaboration with J. De Boer [and others] With biographical notes and tables by J. Korringa.
- The optical basis of the theory of valence / by R. de L. Kronig
- Band spectra and molecular structure / by R. de L. Kronig
- Oral history interview with Ralph de Laer Kronig, 1962 November 12
