= Absorption edge =

In physics, an absorption edge (also known as an absorption discontinuity or absorption limit) is a sharp discontinuity in the absorption spectrum of a substance. These discontinuities occur at wavelengths where the energy of an absorbed photon corresponds to an electronic transition or ionization potential. When the radiation energy is far away from an absorption edge, the absorption spectrum follows a smoothly decreasing function that is proportional to $1/E^3$. However, when the energy matches the binding energy of an electron in an atom the absorption spectrum sharply increases. This is due to the new absorption mechanism (i.e. the process of ionizing the atom by converting all of the quantum energy of the photon into the energy required to overcome the ionization potential).

When the quantum energy of the incident radiation becomes smaller than the work required to eject an electron from one or other quantum states in the constituent absorbing atom, the incident radiation ceases to be absorbed by that state. For example, incident radiation on an atom of a wavelength that has a corresponding energy just below the binding energy of the K-shell electron in that atom cannot eject the K-shell electron.

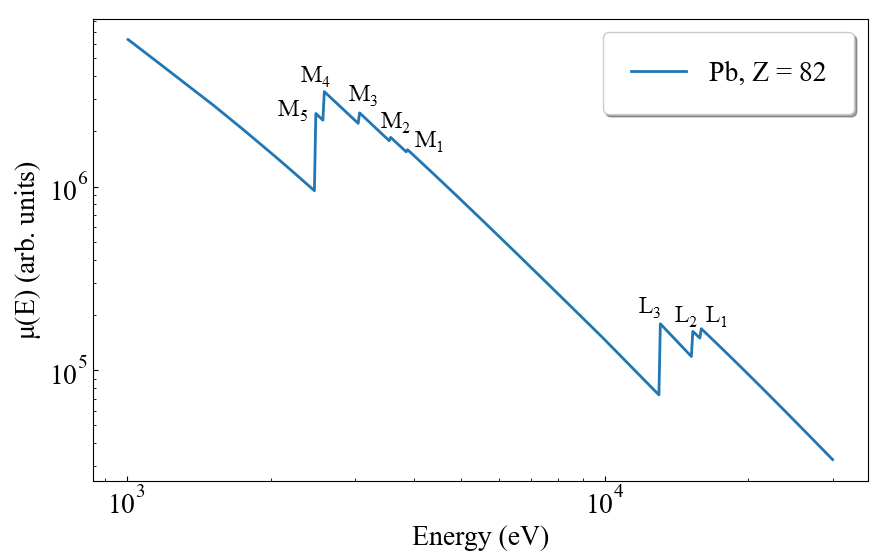
Absorption spectrum for Pb from 1000 to 12000 eV. The individual M and L absorption edges are labeled.

Siegbahn notation is used for notating absorption edges.

In compound semiconductors, the bonding between atoms of different species forms a set of dipoles. These dipoles can absorb energy from an electromagnetic field, achieving a maximum coupling to the radiation when the frequency of the radiation equals a vibrational mode of the dipole. When this happens, the absorption coefficient gets a peak yielding the fundamental edge. This occurs in the far infrared region of the spectrum.

== See also ==
- K-edge
- Siegbahn notation
