= Coster–Kronig transition =

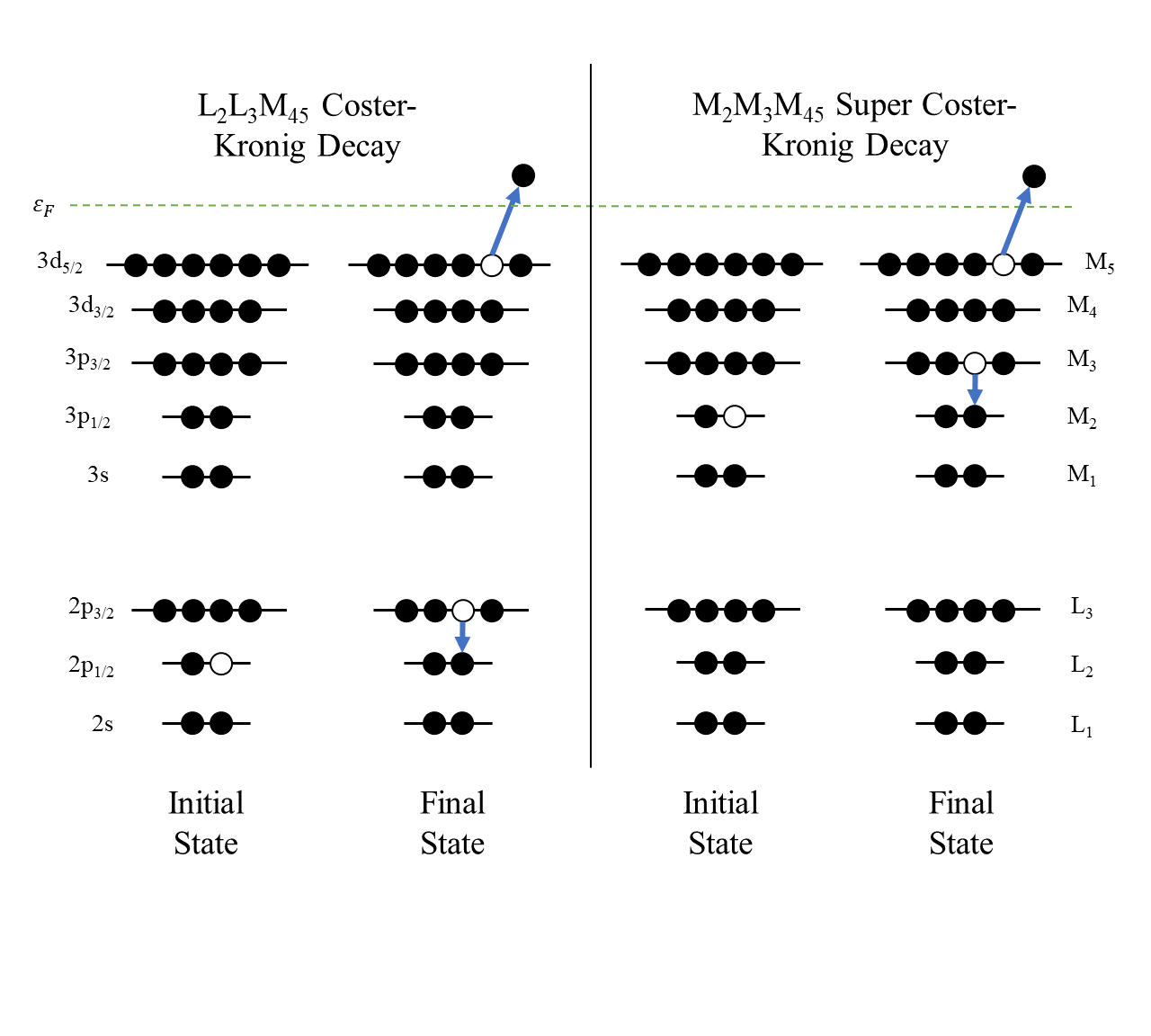
Diagram of the L2L3M45 Coster–Kronig and M2M3M45 super Coster-Kronig decay processes for a 3d transition metal atom

The Coster–Kronig transition is a special case of the Auger process in which the vacancy is filled by an electron from a higher subshell of the same shell.

If, in addition, the electron emitted (the "Auger electron") also belongs to the same shell, one calls this a super Coster–Kronig transition.

The Coster–Kronig process is named after the physicists Dirk Coster and Ralph Kronig.
