= X-ray absorption spectroscopy =

Synchrotron radiation-based spectroscopy

Figure 1: Transitions that contribute to XAS edges

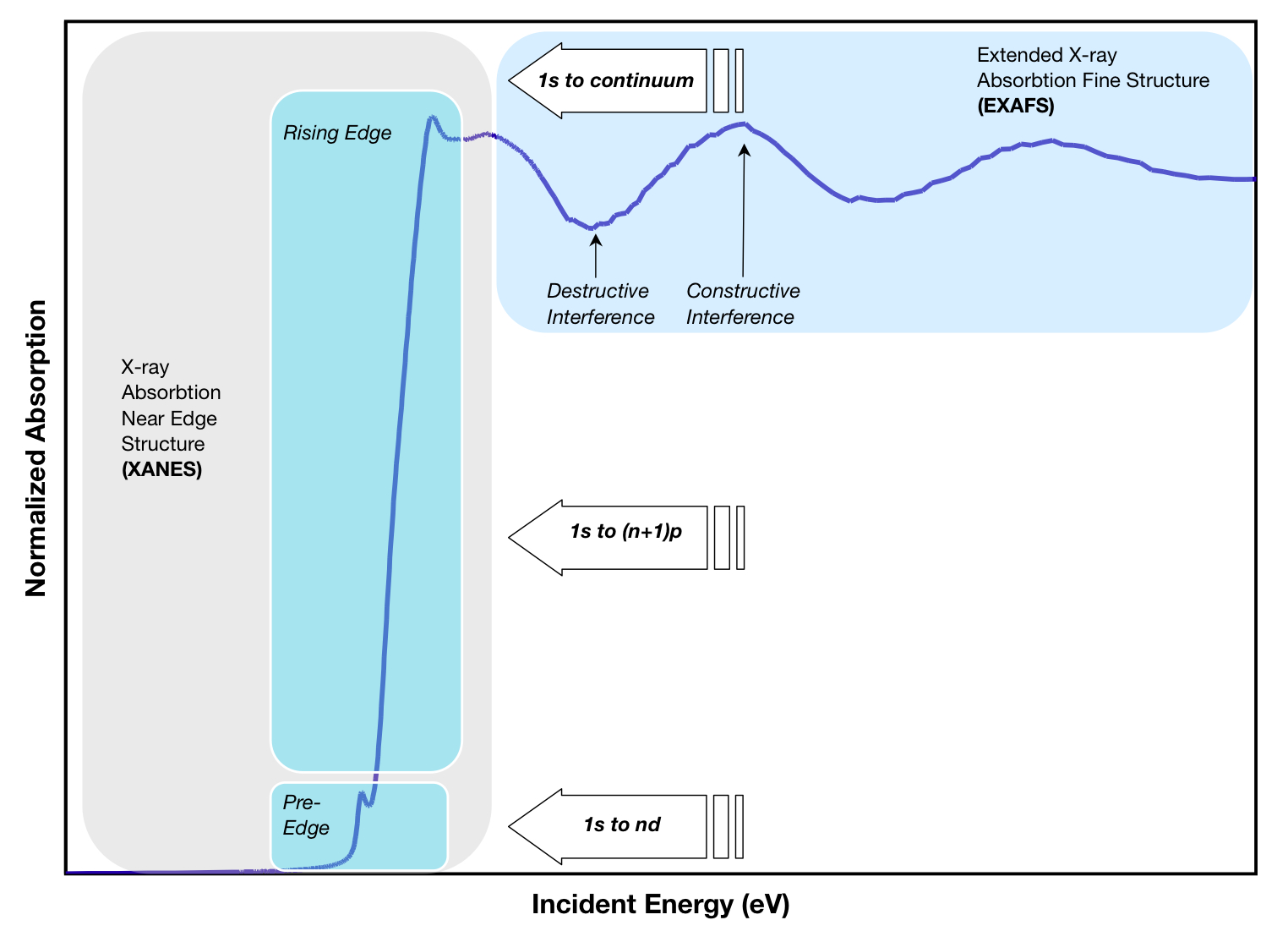
Figure 2: Three regions of XAS data for the K-edge

X-ray absorption spectroscopy (XAS) is a set of advanced techniques used for probing the local environment of matter at atomic level and its electronic structure. The experiments require access to synchrotron radiation facilities for their intense and tunable X-ray beams. Samples can be in the gas phase, solutions, or solids.

== Background ==
XAS data are obtained by tuning the photon energy, using a crystalline monochromator, to a range where core electrons can be excited (0.1-100 keV). The edges are, in part, named by which core electron is excited: the principal quantum numbers n = 1, 2, and 3, correspond to the K-, L-, and M-edges, respectively. For instance, excitation of a 1s electron occurs at the K-edge, while excitation of a 2s or 2p electron occurs at an L-edge (Figure 1).

There are three main regions found on a spectrum generated by XAS data, which are then thought of as separate spectroscopic techniques (Figure 2):

1. The absorption threshold determined by the transition to the lowest unoccupied states:
  1. the states at the Fermi level in metals giving a "rising edge" with an arc tangent shape;
  2. the bound core excitons in insulators with a Lorentzian line-shape (they occur in a pre-edge region at energies lower than the transitions to the lowest unoccupied level);
2. The X-ray absorption near-edge structure (XANES), introduced in 1980 and later in 1983 and also called NEXAFS (near-edge X-ray absorption fine structure), which are dominated by core transitions to quasi bound states (multiple scattering resonances) for photoelectrons with kinetic energy in the range from 10 to 150 eV above the chemical potential, called "shape resonances" in molecular spectra since they are due to final states of short life-time degenerate with the continuum with the Fano line-shape. In this range, multi-electron excitations and many-body final states in strongly correlated systems are relevant;
3. In the high kinetic energy range of the photoelectron, the scattering cross-section with neighbor atoms is weak, and the absorption spectra are dominated by EXAFS (extended X-ray absorption fine structure), where the scattering of the ejected photoelectron of neighboring atoms can be approximated by single scattering events. In 1985, it was shown that multiple scattering theory can be used to interpret both XANES and EXAFS; therefore, the experimental analysis focusing on both regions is now called XAFS.

XAS is a type of absorption spectroscopy from a core initial state with a well-defined symmetry; therefore, the quantum mechanical selection rules select the symmetry of the final states in the continuum, which are usually a mixture of multiple components. The most intense features are due to electric-dipole allowed transitions (i.e. Δℓ = ± 1) to unoccupied final states. For example, the most intense features of a K-edge are due to core transitions from 1s → p-like final states, while the most intense features of the L_{3}-edge are due to 2p → d-like final states.

XAS methodology can be broadly divided into four experimental categories that can yield complementary results: metal K-edge, metal L-edge, ligand K-edge, and EXAFS.

The most obvious means of mapping heterogeneous samples beyond x-ray absorption contrast is through elemental analysis by x-ray fluorescence, similar to EDX methods in electron microscopy.

== Applications ==
XAS is a technique used in various scientific fields, including molecular and condensed matter physics, materials science and engineering, chemistry, earth science, and biology. In particular, its unique sensitivity to the local structure, as compared to x-ray diffraction, has been exploited for studying:

- Amorphous solids and liquid systems
- Solid solutions
- Doping and ion implantation materials for electronics
- Local distortions of crystal lattices
- Organometallic compounds
- Metalloproteins
- Metal clusters
- Catalysis
- Vibrational dynamics
- Ions in solutions
- Speciation of elements
- Liquid water and aqueous solutions
- Used to detect bone fractures
- Used to determine the concentration of any liquid in any tank

== See also ==
- X-ray absorption near edge structure (XANES)
- X-ray emission spectroscopy
