= X-ray absorption near edge structure =

Type of X-ray absorption spectrometry requiring a synchrotron radiation facility

X-ray absorption near edge structure (XANES), also known as near edge X-ray absorption fine structure (NEXAFS), is a type of absorption spectroscopy that indicates the features in the X-ray absorption spectra (XAS) of condensed matter due to the photoabsorption cross section for electronic transitions from an atomic core level to final states in the energy region of 50–100 eV above the selected atomic core level ionization energy, where the wavelength of the photoelectron is larger than the interatomic distance between the absorbing atom and its first neighbour atoms. The technique is useful to study electronic properties, local structure and geometry around selected photoabsorbing atomic species.

== Theory ==
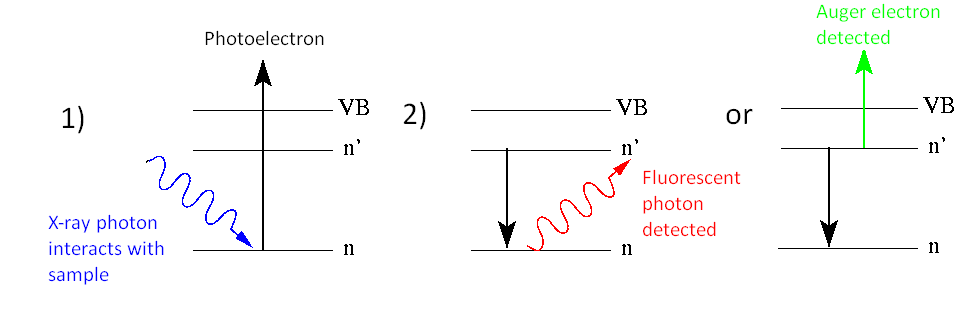
The fundamental processes which contribute to XANES spectra: 1) photoabsorption of an x-ray into a core level followed by photoelectron emission, followed by either 2) (left) filling of the core hole by an electron in another level, accompanied by fluorescence; or (right) filling of the core hole by an electron in another level followed by emission of an Auger electron.

The fundamental phenomenon underlying XANES is the absorption of an x-ray photon by condensed matter with the formation of many body excited states characterized by a core hole in a selected atomic core level (refer to the first Figure). In the single-particle theory approximation, the system is separated into one electron in the core levels of the selected atomic species of the system and N-1 passive electrons. In this approximation the final state is described by a core hole in the atomic core level and an excited photoelectron. The final state has a very short life time because of the short life-time of the core hole and the short mean free path of the excited photoelectron with kinetic energy in the range around 20-50 eV. The core hole is filled either via an Auger process or by capture of an electron from another shell followed by emission of a fluorescent photon. The difference between XANES/NEXAFS and traditional photoemission experiments is that in photoemission, the initial photoelectron itself is measured, while in NEXAFS the fluorescent photon or Auger electron or an inelastically scattered photoelectron may also be measured. The distinction sounds trivial but is actually significant: in photoemission the final state of the emitted electron captured in the detector must be an extended, free-electron state. By contrast, in NEXAFS the final state of the photoelectron may be a bound state such as an exciton since the photoelectron itself need not be detected. The effect of measuring fluorescent photons, Auger electrons, and directly emitted electrons is to sum over all possible final states of the photoelectrons, meaning that what NEXAFS measures is the total joint density of states of the initial core level with all final states, consistent with conservation rules. The distinction is critical because in spectroscopy final states are more susceptible to many-body effects than initial states, meaning that NEXAFS spectra are more easily calculable than photoemission spectra. Due to the summation over final states, various sum rules are helpful in the interpretation of NEXAFS spectra. When the x-ray photon energy resonantly connects a core level with a narrow final state in a solid, such as an exciton, readily identifiable characteristic peaks will appear in the spectrum. These narrow characteristic spectral peaks give the NEXAFS technique a lot of its analytical power as illustrated by the B 1s π* exciton shown in the second Figure.

Synchrotron radiation has a natural polarization that can be utilized to great advantage in NEXAFS studies. The commonly studied molecular adsorbates have sigma and pi bonds that may have a particular orientation on a surface. The angle dependence of the x-ray absorption tracks the orientation of resonant bonds due to dipole selection rules.

Modern interpretation of XANES/NEXAFS is usually related to the application of the multiple-scattering theory developed since the early 1970s by several scientists (see for example one of the first papers).

== Experimental considerations ==
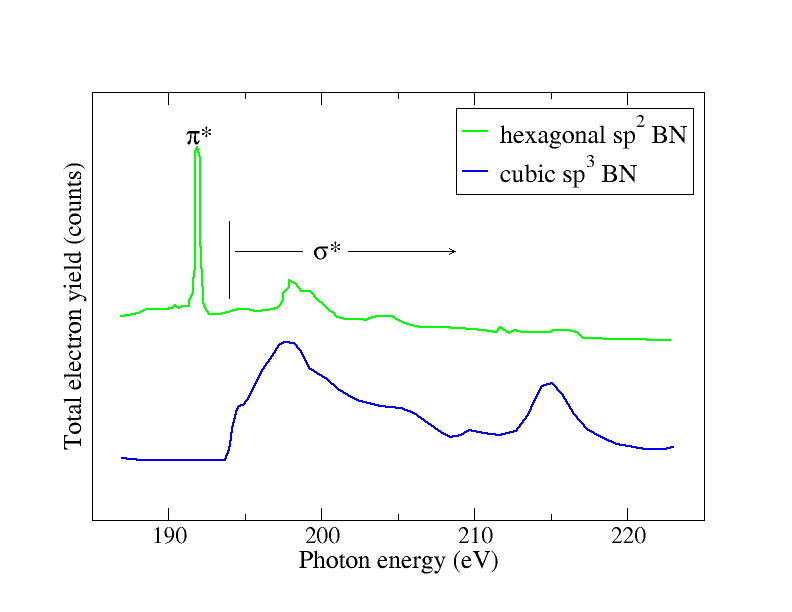
Normal-incidence boron 1s x-ray absorption spectra for two types of BN powder. The cubic phase shows only σ-bonding while the hexagonal phase shows both π and σ bonding.

Soft x-ray absorption spectra are usually measured either through the fluorescent yield, in which emitted photons are monitored, or total electron yield, in which the sample is connected to ground through an ammeter and the neutralization current is monitored. Because NEXAFS measurements require an intense tunable source of soft x-rays, they are performed at synchrotrons. Because soft x-rays are absorbed by air, the synchrotron radiation travels from the ring in an evacuated beam-line to the end-station where the specimen to be studied is mounted. Specialized beam-lines intended for NEXAFS studies often have additional capabilities such as heating a sample or exposing it to a dose of reactive gas.

== Energy range ==
=== Edge energy range ===
In the absorption edge region of metals, the photoelectron is excited to the first unoccupied level above the Fermi level. Therefore, its mean free path in a pure single crystal at zero temperature is as large as infinite, and it remains very large, increasing the energy of the final state up to about 5 eV above the Fermi level. Beyond the role of the unoccupied density of states and matrix elements in single electron excitations, many-body effects appear as an "infrared singularity" at the absorption threshold in metals.

In the absorption edge region of insulators the photoelectron is excited to the first unoccupied level above the chemical potential but the unscreened core hole forms a localized bound state called core exciton.

=== EXAFS energy range ===
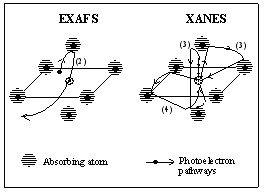
Pictorial view of photoelectron scattering processes in the single-scattering regime, EXAFS (this assumes the single scattering approximation... multiple scattering can be considered with EXAFS), and in the multiple scattering regime, XANES. In EXAFS the photoelectron is scattered only by a single neighbour atom, in XANES all the scattering pathways, classified according to the number of scattering event (3), (4), (5) etc. contribute to the absorption cross section.

The fine structure in the x-ray absorption spectra in the high energy range extending from about 150 eV beyond the ionization potential is a powerful tool to determine the atomic pair distribution (i.e. interatomic distances) with a time scale of about 10^{−15} s. In fact the final state of the excited photoelectron in the high kinetic energy range (150-2000 eV ) is determined only by single backscattering events due to the low amplitude photoelectron scattering.

=== NEXAFS energy range ===
In the NEXAFS region, starting about 5 eV beyond the absorption threshold, because of the low kinetic energy range (5-150 eV) the photoelectron backscattering amplitude by neighbor atoms is very large so that multiple scattering events become dominant in the NEXAFS spectra.

The different energy range between NEXAFS and EXAFS can be also explained in a very simple manner by the comparison between the photoelectron wavelength $\lambda$ and the interatomic distance of the photoabsorber-backscatterer pair. The photoelectron kinetic energy is connected with the wavelength $\lambda$ by the following relation:

$$E_\text{kinetic} = h\nu - E_\text{binding} = \hbar^2 k^2/(2m) = (2\pi)^2 \hbar^2/(2m\lambda^2),$$

which means that for high energy the wavelength is shorter than interatomic distances and hence the EXAFS region corresponds to a single scattering regime; while for lower E, $\lambda$ is larger than interatomic distances and the XANES region is associated with a multiple scattering regime.

== Final states ==
The absorption peaks of NEXAFS spectra are determined by multiple scattering resonances of the photoelectron excited at the atomic absorption site and scattered by neighbor atoms. The local character of the final states is determined by the short photoelectron mean free path, that is strongly reduced (down to about 0.3 nm at 50 eV) in this energy range because of inelastic scattering of the photoelectron by electron-hole excitations (excitons) and collective electronic oscillations of the valence electrons called plasmons.

== Applications ==
The great power of NEXAFS derives from its elemental specificity. Because the various elements have different core level energies, NEXAFS permits extraction of the signal from a surface monolayer or even a single buried layer in the presence of a huge background signal. Buried layers are very important in engineering applications, such as magnetic recording media buried beneath a surface lubricant or dopants below an electrode in an integrated circuit. Because NEXAFS can also determine the chemical state of elements which are present in bulk in minute quantities, it has found widespread use in environmental chemistry and geochemistry. The ability of NEXAFS to study buried atoms is due to its integration over all final states including inelastically scattered electrons, as opposed to photoemission and Auger spectroscopy, which study atoms only with a layer or two of the surface.

Much chemical information can be extracted from the NEXAFS region: formal valence (very difficult to experimentally determine in a nondestructive way); coordination environment (e.g., octahedral, tetrahedral coordination) and subtle geometrical distortions of it.

Transitions to bound vacant states just above the Fermi level can be seen. Thus NEXAFS spectra can be used as a probe of the unoccupied band structure of a material.

The near-edge structure is characteristic of an environment and valence state hence one of its more common uses is in fingerprinting: if you have a mixture of sites/compounds in a sample you can fit the measured spectra with a linear combinations of NEXAFS spectra of known species and determine the proportion of each site/compound in the sample. One example of such a use is the determination of the oxidation state of the plutonium in the soil at Rocky Flats.

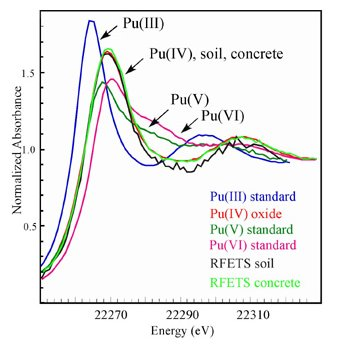
The XANES experiments done on plutonium in soil, concrete and standards of the different oxidation states.

== Terminology ==
Both XANES and NEXAFS are acceptable terms for the same technique. XANES name was invented in 1980 by Antonio Bianconi to indicate strong absorption peaks in X-ray absorption spectra in condensed matter due to multiple scattering resonances above the ionization energy. The name NEXAFS was introduced in 1983 by Jo Stohr and is synonymous with XANES, but is generally used when applied to surface and molecular science.

== History ==
The interpretation of the near-edge structures in terms of multiple-scattering theory dates back to the early seventies.The acronym XANES was first used in 1980 during interpretation of multiple scattering resonances spectra measured at the Stanford Synchrotron Radiation Laboratory (SSRL) by A. Bianconi. In 1982 the first paper on the application of XANES for determination of local structural geometrical distortions using multiple scattering theory was published by A. Bianconi, P. J. Durham and J. B. Pendry. In 1983 the first NEXAFS paper examining molecules adsorbed on surfaces appeared. The first XAFS paper, describing the intermediate region between EXAFS and XANES, appeared in 1987.

== Software for NEXAFS analysis ==
- ADF Calculation of NEXAFS using spin-orbit coupling TDDFT or the Slater-TS method.
- FDMNES Calculation of NEXAFS using finite difference method and full multiple scattering theory.
- FEFF8 Calculation of NEXAFS using full multiple scattering theory.
- MXAN NEXAFS fitting using full multiple scattering theory.
- FitIt NEXAFS fitting using multidimensional interpolation approximation.
- PARATEC NEXAFS calculation using plane-wave pseudopotential approach
- WIEN2k NEXAFS calculation on the basis of full-potential (linearized) augmented plane-wave approach.

== Bibliography ==
- "X-ray Absorption Near-Edge Structure (XANES) Spectroscopy", G. S. Henderson, F. M. F. de Groot, B. J. A. Moulton in Spectroscopic Methods in Mineralogy and Materials Sciences, (G.S. Henderson, D. R. Neuville, R. T. Downs, Eds) Reviews in Mineralogy & Geochemistry vol. 78, p 75, 2014. DOI:10.2138/rmg.2014.78.3.
- "X-ray Absorption: Principles, Applications, Techniques of EXAFS, SEXAFS, and XANES", D. C. Koningsberger, R. Prins; A. Bianconi, P.J. Durham Chapters, Chemical Analysis 92, John Wiley & Sons, 1988.
- "Principles and Applications of EXAFS" Chapter 10 in Handbook of Synchrotron Radiation, pp 995–1014. E. A. Stern and S. M. Heald, E. E. Koch, ed., North-Holland, 1983.
- NEXAFS Spectroscopy by J. Stöhr, Springer 1992, ISBN 3-540-54422-4.
