= Zhang Ping =

Zhang Ping or Ping Zhang may refers to:

- Zhang Ping (Sixteen Kingdoms) (died 361), warlord during the Sixteen Kingdoms period
- Zhang Ping (politician) (born 1946), Chinese politician
- Zhang Ping (writer) (born 1953), Chinese novelist
- Zhang Ping (engineer) (born 1959), Chinese engineer
- Zhang Ping (volleyball) (born 1982), Chinese volleyball player
- Zhang Ping (actor) (1917–1986), Chinese actor
- Ping Zhang (information scientist)
- Ping Zhang (graph theorist)
- Ping Zhang (biologist)
