= Gregori Aminoff Prize =

Award in the field of crystallography

The Gregori Aminoff Prize is an international prize awarded since 1979 by the Royal Swedish Academy of Sciences in the field of crystallography, rewarding "a documented, individual contribution in the field of crystallography, including areas concerned with the dynamics of the formation and dissolution of crystal structures. Some preference should be shown for work evincing elegance in the approach to the problem."

The prize, which is named in memory of the Swedish scientist and artist Gregori Aminoff (1883–1947), Professor of Mineralogy at the Swedish Museum of Natural History from 1923, was endowed through a bequest by his widow Birgit Broomé-Aminoff. The prize can be shared by several winners.

== Recipients of the Prize ==
Source: Royal Swedish Academy of Science

Year	Laureate^{[A]}	Country^{[B]}	Institute^{[C]}	Rationale^{[D]}	Ref
1979	Paul Peter Ewald	United StatesGermany	Not Listed	"For his fundamental contributions to the development of the science of crystallography."	
1980	(No prize awarded)				
1981	Charles Frank	United Kingdom	Not Listed	"For your fundamental contributions to the development of the science of crystallography."	
1982	Gunnar Hägg	Sweden	Not Listed	"For his pioneering application of x-ray crystallography in inorganic chemistry."	
1983	J. M. Robertson	United Kingdom	Not Listed	"For your fundamental contributions to the development of the science of crystallography."	
1984	David Harker	United States	Not Listed	"For your fundamental contributions to the development of methods in X-ray crystallography."	
1985	André Guinier	France	Not Listed	"For your fundamental experimental and theoretical studies of the dispersion of X-rays with application to the study of structures of condensed systems."	
1986	Erwin Félix Bertaut	France	Not Listed	"Pour vos ouvrages eminents en cristallographie théorique et expérimentale, en particulier concernant les structures magnétiques."	
1987	Otto Kratky	Austria	Not Listed	"Für die Entwicklung der Kleinwinkelmethode bei Röntgen Studien der Struktur von Makromolekülen."	
1988	Isabella L. Karle	United States	Not Listed	"For her eminent crystallographic investigations of complicated natural products."	
1989	Arne Magnéli	Sweden	Not Listed	"For his epoch-making crystallographic studies of the building principles oxide compounds, which decisively have changed the view of the relations between stoichiometry and structure in inorganic chemistry."	
1990	Jack Dunitz	Switzerland	Not Listed	"For your eminent way of using structure analysis as a tool for studying different chemical problems."	
1991	David Phillips	United Kingdom	Not Listed	"For his fundamental results on the catalytic mechanism of enzymes."	
1992	Michael Mark Woolfson	United Kingdom	Not Listed	"For your development of direct methods for statistical phase determination of crystal structures."	
1993	Clifford G. Shull	United States	Not Listed	"For your development and application of neutron diffraction methods for studies of atomic and magnetic structures of solids."	
1994	Michael G. Rossmann	United States	Not Listed	"For your fundamental methodological work on the utilization of non-crystallographic symmetry, with its especially important applications within protein and virus crystallography."	
1995	Hugo M. Rietveld	Netherlands	Not Listed	"In recognition of his development of profile refinement methods for the analysis of powder diffraction data."	
1996	Philip Coppens	United States	Not Listed	"In recognition of your outstanding methodological and structure chemical achievements in Crystallography, especially the studies of electron distribution in different types of chemical bonds."	
1997	Wayne A. Hendrickson	United States	Not Listed	"For your contributions to phase angle determination of macromolecular crystals using anomalous dispersion and measurements at multiple wavelengths."	
1998	Pieter Maarten de Wolff	Netherlands	Not Listed	"For your contributions to the theory and practise of modulated structure refinements."	
1998	Ted Janssen	Netherlands	Not Listed	"For your contributions to the theory and practise of modulated structure refinements."	
1998	Aloysio Janner	Switzerland	Not Listed	"For your contributions to the theory and practise of modulated structure refinements."	
1999	Richard Henderson	United Kingdom	Not Listed	"For your development of methods for structure determination of biological macromolecules using electron diffraction."	
1999	Nigel Unwin	United Kingdom	Not Listed	"For your development of methods for structure determination of biological macromolecules using electron diffraction."	
2000	Dan Shechtman	Israel	Not Listed	"For your discovery of quasicrystals."	
2001	Kenneth C. Holmes	Germany	Not Listed	"For his pioneering development of methods to study biological macromolecules, in particular muscle proteins, by synchrotron radiation."	
2002	Leslie Leiserowitz	Israel	Weizmann Institute of Science	"for your fundamental studies of crystal growth and application to separation of enantiomers and for your studies of surface structures by synchrotron radiation"	
2002	Meir Lahav	Israel	Weizmann Institute of Science	"for your fundamental studies of crystal growth and application to separation of enantiomers and for your studies of surface structures by synchrotron radiation"	
2003	Axel Brunger	United States	Stanford University	"for his development of refinement techniques for macromolecules"	
2003	T. Alwyn Jones	Sweden	Uppsala Universitet	"for his pioneering development of methods to interpret electron density maps and to build models of biological macromolecules with the aid of computer graphics"	
2004	(No prize awarded)				
2005	Ho-Kwang Mao	United States	Geophysical Laboratory	"for his pioneering research of solid materials at ultrahigh pressures and temperatures"	
2006	Stephen Harrison	United States	Harvard University	"for their remarkable contributions in virus crystallography"	
2006	David Stuart	United Kingdom	Oxford University	"for their remarkable contributions in virus crystallography"	
2007	Sumio Iijima	Japan	Meijo University	"for his structural studies of carbon nanotubes"	
2008	Hans Eklund	Sweden	Swedish University of Agricultural Sciences	"for his crystallographic studies of ribonucleotide reductase. The studies contribute to a detailed understanding of function and activity of an enzyme with a central biological role"	
2009	George M. Sheldrick	Great Britain	University of Göttingen	"for their contributions to theoretical development and methodological implementation in crystallography"	
2009	Gérard Bricogne	France	Global Phasing Ltd	"for their contributions to theoretical development and methodological implementation in crystallography"	
2010	So Iwata	Japan	Imperial College London	"for his seminal crystallographic studies of membrane proteins. Using state-of-the-art crystallographic methods, he has elucidated vital biological functions within the fields of cellular respiration, photosynthesis and molecular transport"	
2011	Lia Addadi	Israel	Weizmann Institute of Science	"for their crystallographic studies of biomineralization processes, which have led to an understanding of mechanisms of mineral formation"	
2011	Stephen Weiner	Israel	Weizmann Institute of Science	"for their crystallographic studies of biomineralization processes, which have led to an understanding of mechanisms of mineral formation"	
2012	Marat Yusupov	Russia; France	Institut de Génétique et de Biologie Moléculaire et Cellulaire	"for their crystallographic studies on ribosomes, translators of the code of life"	
2012	Gulnara Yusupova	Russia; France	Institut de Génétique et de Biologie Moléculaire et Cellulaire	"for their crystallographic studies on ribosomes, translators of the code of life"	
2012	Harry F. Noller	United States	University of California, Santa Cruz	"for their crystallographic studies on ribosomes, translators of the code of life"	
2013	Carlo Gatti	Italy	Institute of Molecular Sciences and Technology, Italian National Research Council (CNR-ISTM)	"for developing experimental and theoretical methods to study electron density in crystals, and using them to determine molecular and crystalline properties"	
2013	Mark Spackman	Australia	University of Western Australia	"for developing experimental and theoretical methods to study electron density in crystals, and using them to determine molecular and crystalline properties"	
2014	Yigong Shi	China	Tsinghua University	"for his groundbreaking crystallographic studies of proteins and protein complexes that regulate programmed cell death"	
2015	Ian Robinson	United Kingdom	London Centre for Nanotechnology	"for his development of diffraction methods for studying surfaces and nanomaterials"	
2016	Poul Nissen	Denmark	Aarhus University	"for their fundamental contributions to understanding the structural basis for ATP-driven translocation of ions across membranes"	
2016	Chikashi Toyoshima	Japan	University of Tokyo	"for their fundamental contributions to understanding the structural basis for ATP-driven translocation of ions across membranes"	
2017	Natalia Dubrovinskaia	Sweden	University of Bayreuth	"for their development of new methodology for in-situ experimental determination of crystal structures under extreme conditions of high temperature and pressure"	
2017	Leonid Dubrovinsky	Sweden	University of Bayreuth	"for their development of new methodology for in-situ experimental determination of crystal structures under extreme conditions of high temperature and pressure"	
2018	Piet Gros	Netherlands	Utrecht University	"for his fundamental contributions to understanding the structural basis for the complement system-mediated innate immune response"	
2019	Michael O'Keeffe	England; United States	Arizona State University	"for their fundamental contributions to the development of reticular chemistry"	
2019	Omar M. Yaghi	Jordan; United States	University of California, Berkeley	"for their fundamental contributions to the development of reticular chemistry"	
2020	Jian-Ren Shen	China	Okayama University	“for their fundamental contributions to the understanding of biological redox metal clusters”	
2020	Douglas Rees	United States	California Institute of Technology	“for their fundamental contributions to the understanding of biological redox metal clusters”	
2021	Henry Chapman	United Kingdom	DESY, University of Hamburg	“for their fundamental contributions to the development of X-ray free electron laser based structural biology”	
2021	Janos Hajdu	Sweden	Uppsala University	“for their fundamental contributions to the development of X-ray free electron laser based structural biology”	
2021	John Spence	United States; Australia	Arizona State University	“for their fundamental contributions to the development of X-ray free electron laser based structural biology”	
2022	Elena Conti	Italy	Max Planck Institute of Biochemistry	“for structural studies of synthesis and regulated degradation of RNA”	
2022	Patrick Cramer	Germany	Max Planck Institute of Biochemistry	“for structural studies of synthesis and regulated degradation of RNA”	
2022	Seth Darst	United States	Rockefeller University	“for structural studies of synthesis and regulated degradation of RNA”	
2023	Olga Kennard	United Kingdom	University of Cambridge	"for pioneering work to establish molecular structure databases"	
2024	Hao Wu	United States	Harvard Medical School	"for her discoveries by crystallography of the assembly mechanisms of large oligomeric signaling complexes in innate immunity, a paradigm-shifting concept in signal transduction"	
2025	Simon Billinge	United States	Columbia University	"for a decisive contribution to making the pair distribution function a widely useful tool for structural and materials science"	

Country	Number of laureates
United States	19* (12 US-born)
United Kingdom	11
Canada	
Israel	4
China	4
Sweden	3
France	3
Japan	3
Hungary	2
Switzerland	2
Germany	2
Italy	2
Australia	1
Austria	1
Russia	2
Jordan	1
DDR	1

== See also ==
- List of chemistry awards
- List of physics awards
