= Christopher Tate =

Christopher Tate or Chris Tate may refer to:

- Chris Tate, Emmerdale character
- Chris Tate (footballer)
- Christopher G. Tate British biochemist
- Christopher Tate (film editor), see 18th Genie Awards
