= Ewald Prize =

Award in crystallography

In 1986 the International Union of Crystallography (IUCr) established the Ewald Prize for outstanding contributions to the science of crystallography. The Ewald Prize is considered the highest prize available to crystallographers apart from the Nobel Prize. The Ewald Prize has been described as prestigious, acclaimed and coveted.

The prize is named after Paul Peter Ewald for his contributions to the founding and leadership of the IUCr. The prize consists of a medal, a certificate and a financial award (US$20,000 in 1987). It is presented once every three years during the triennial International Congresses of Crystallography. The first prize was presented during the XIV Congress at Perth, Australia, in 1987.

The prize is open to any scientist who has made contributions of exceptional distinction to the science of crystallography, irrespective of nationality, age or experience. The prize may be shared by several contributors to the same scientific achievement.

== Prize Winners ==
#	Year	Winners	Award Statement	Refs.
1st	1987	John M. Cowley and A.F. Moodie	"For their outstanding achievements in electron diffraction and microscopy. They carried out pioneering work on the dynamical scattering of electrons and the direct imaging of crystal structures and structure defects by high-resolution electron microscopy. The physical optics approach used by Cowley and Moodie takes into account many hundreds of scattered beams, and represents a far-reaching extension of the dynamical theory for X-rays, first developed by P.P. Ewald".	
2nd	1990	B.K. Vainshtein	"For his contributions to the development of theories and methods of structure analysis by electron and X-ray diffraction and for his applications of his theories to structural investigations of polymers, liquid crystals, peptides and proteins".	
3rd	1993	Norio Kato	"For his outstanding and profound contributions to the dynamical theory of X-ray diffraction of spherical waves by perfect crystals and slightly deformed (nearly perfect) crystals, for the experimental exploitation of these theories towards the characterization of the defect structure of single crystals and for his extraordinary achievements in X-ray diffraction topography".	
4th	1996	Michael Rossmann	"For his work on molecular replacement and the use of non-crystallographic symmetry in the determination of macromolecular structure and for his research on the structure of viruses, which is foremost among the triumphs of crystallography".	
5th	1999	G. N. Ramachandran	"For his outstanding contributions to the field of crystallography: in the area of anomalous scattering and its use in the solution of the phase problem, in the analysis of the structure of fibres, collagen in particular, and, foremost, for his fundamental works on the macromolecular conformation and the validation of macromolecular structures by means of the 'Ramachandran plot', which even today remains the most useful validation tool".	
6th	2002	Michael Woolfson	"For his exceptional contributions in developing the conceptual and theoretical framework of direct methods along with the algorithm design and computer programs for automatic solutions that changed the face of structural science and for his contributions to crystallographic education and international collaboration, which have strengthened the intellectual development of crystallographers worldwide".	
7th	2005	Philip Coppens	"For his contributions to developing the fields of electron density determination and the crystallography of molecular excited states, and for his contributions to the education and inspiration of young crystallographers as an enthusiastic teacher by participating in and organizing many courses and workshops".	
8th	2008	David Sayre	"For the unique breadth of his contributions to crystallography, which range from seminal contributions to the solving of the phase problem to the complex physics of imaging generic objects by X-ray diffraction and microscopy, and for never losing touch with the physical reality of the processes involved".	
9th	2011	Eleanor Dodson, Carmelo Giacovazzo and George M. Sheldrick	"For the enormous impact they have made on structural crystallography through the development of new methods that have then been made available to users as constantly maintained and extended software. Their invaluable contributions to computational crystallography have resulted in the leading program suites CCP4, SIR and SHELX, respectively. All over the world thousands of crystallographers benefit from their achievements on a daily basis".	
10th	2014	Aloysio Janner and Ted Janssen	"For the development of superspace crystallography and its application to the analysis of aperiodic crystals".	
11th	2017	Tom Blundell	"For his work as one of the worldwide leaders in crystallographic innovation, especially at the interface with life sciences; starting with his work on determining the structure of insulin with Dorothy Hodgkin, he determined an exceptionally broad array of medically critical human protein structures, championing methods enabling drug design and discovery through structural optimization, crystallographic fragment screening, and computational modelling, and for being a leader in advanced crystallographic education internationally".	
12th	2021	Olga Kennard	"For her invaluable pioneering contribution to the development of crystallographic databases, in particular the Cambridge Structural Database (CSD)".	
13th	2023	Wayne Hendrickson	"For his exceptional contribution to structural biology including the development of MAD/SAD methods and crystallographic theory. No-one else is so singularly and formatively identified with the explosive growth in biological crystallography and the consequent benefits to chemistry and biology".	
14th	2026	Gautam R. Desiraju	"For pioneering the subject of crystal engineering and the supramolecular synthon concept, and for establishing the structural significance of weak hydrogen bonding and halogen bonding in molecular crystals and biology.".	
