= Chikashi Toyoshima =

Japanese biophysicist

- Born: July 17, 1954 (age 72); Akita, Japan
- Citizenship: Japan
- Education: University of Tokyo
- Known for: Calcium ATPase
- Awards: Gregori Aminoff Prize (2016)
- Scientific career
- Fields: Biophysics
- Workplaces: for Structural Biology of Challenging Proteins; Institute of Molecular and Cellular Biosciences; University of Tokyo
- Website: www.iam.u-tokyo.ac.jp/StrBiol/en/

Chikashi Toyoshima (Japanese: 豊島 近, Hepburn: Toyoshima Chikashi; born July 17, 1954) is a Japanese biophysicist, a professor at the University of Tokyo and a Foreign Associate of the National Academy of Sciences in the United States. His research focuses on two proteins: the Ca^{2+} ATPase, and the Na^{+}/ K^{+}-ATPase. Toyoshima's research about Ca^{2+} ATPase started in 1989. He and his colleagues obtained the world's first series of images of Ca^{2+} ATPase at the atomic level. He has determined the crystal structures of ten intermediates of Ca^{2+} ATPase via X-ray crystallography, cryogenic electron microscopy (cryo-EM), among other methods. Toyoshima and Poul Nissen were awarded the Gregori Aminoff Prize in 2016 by The Royal Swedish Academy of Sciences for their fundamental contributions to understanding the structural basis for ATP-driven translocation of ions across membranes.

== Early life and education ==
Toyoshima was born in Honjō in the prefecture of Akita, Japan. Toyoshima and his elder brother worked on science experiments at home with their mother. In 1973, he was admitted to the University of Tokyo. He studied regular physics, biochemistry, and botany during his first two years at the university. In the middle of his third year, he visited Setsuro Ebashi's laboratory, which used electron microscopes. He received his undergraduate degree in 1978. For his master's and doctoral research, Toyoshima focused on the microscopy of thin muscle filaments and myosin heads under the supervision of Setsuro Ebashi. Then in 1983, he completed his doctoral degree.

== Career ==
In 1984, Toyoshima became a research associate at the University of Tokyo. Two years later, he took a postdoctoral position at the laboratory of biophysicist with Nigel Unwin at Stanford University. Under Unwin, Toyoshima worked to develop mathematical methods for disentangling the superimposed information from a projection image or electron micrograph of a tubular structure.

In 1988, Toyoshima followed Unwin to the Medical Research Council's Laboratory of Molecular Biology, where he met and collaborated with biophysicist David Stokes, who was also studying the Ca^{2+} ATPase.

After moving back to Japan in 1989, he joined the Frontier Research Program at RIKEN as a research scientist. He joined the Tokyo Institute of Technology as an associate professor in 1990. In 1994, Toyoshima was offered a faculty position at the University of Tokyo, where he is currently a professor at the Center for Structural Biology of Challenging Proteins within the Institute of Molecular and Cellular Bio-sciences.

== Research ==
Early in his research career, Toyoshima worked on "3 dimensional image analysis of muscle thin filaments decorated by Myosin heads" as an electron microscopist in the Department of Physics at the University of Tokyo. He later conducted research on the acetylcholine receptor after studying cryo-EM in Nigel Unwin's laboratory in 1986. There, he developed a new algorithm to untangle the superimposed images obtained from the cryo-EM. In doing so, he reconstructed a 3D structure of an ion channel at 17 Å resolution. This was the first 3D reconstruction of this ion channel. Soon afterward, the same method was applied to reconstruct the 3D structure of the Ca^{2+} ATPase with help from David Stokes. Toyoshima and Stokes published their analysis of the structure of this protein in Nature in 1993.

After returning to Japan, Toyoshima continued to focus on the structure of the Ca^{2+}-ATPase. Toyoshima obtained and photographed large crystals of the Ca^{2+} ATPase in their first state, the E1·2Ca^{2+} by combining X-ray crystallography and the crystallization methods for electron microscopy. He published the first high-resolution images of P-type ATPases in 2000.

As of 2023, he has determined the crystal structures of the Ca^{2+} ATPase in ten different states by X-ray crystallography, covering roughly the entire reaction cycle. He also extended his research to the Na^{+}, K^{+}-ATPase and has developed a methodology for electron crystallography of ultra-thin 3 dimensional protein crystals.

== Awards ==
- Asahi Prize, Asahi Shimbun (2009)
- Yamazaki-Teiichi Prize (2011)
- Medal with Purple Ribbon (2015)
- Uehara Prize, The Uehara Memorial Foundation (2015)
- Gregori Aminoff Prize, The Royal Swedish Academy of Sciences (2016; awarded September 10, 2015)
- Asian Scientist 100, Asian Scientist, 2019
