= Lia Addadi =

Israeli biochemist

- ליה אדדי
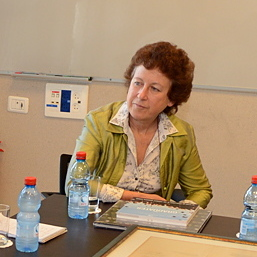
- Lia Addadi in the Weizmann Institute of Science
- Born: 1950 (age 75–76); Padua, Italy
- Education: University of Padua (BS, MS); Weizmann Institute of Science (PhD)
- Awards: Prelog Medal (1998); Gregori Aminoff Prize (2011); Member, National Academy of Sciences (2017)
- Scientific career
- Fields: Biomineralization
- Workplaces: Weizmann Institute of Science; Harvard University
- Thesis: Planning and execution of a solid State "absolute" asymmetric dimerization and polymerization with quantitative Enantiomeric yield (1979)
- Doctoral advisor: Meir Lahav
- Notable students: Julia Mahamid
- Website: www.weizmann.ac.il/csb/Addadi/

Lia Addadi (Hebrew: ליה אדדי; born 1950) is a professor of structural biology at the Weizmann Institute of Science. She works on crystallization in biology, including biomineralization, interactions with cells, and crystallization in cell membranes. She was elected a member of the National Academy of Sciences (NAS) in 2017 for “distinguished and continuing achievements in original research”, and a member of the American Philosophical Society in 2020.

== Early life and education ==
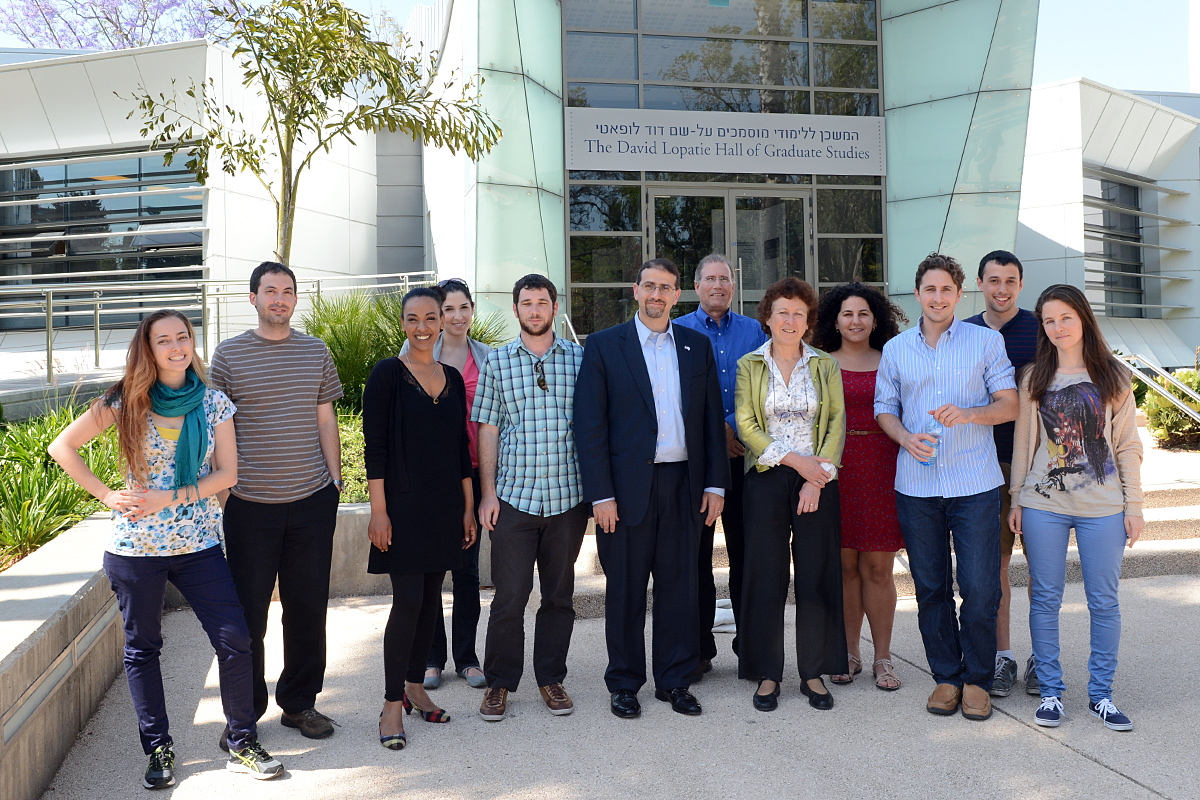
Lia Addadi (fifth from right) outside the David Lopatie Hall of Graduate studies

Addadi was born in Padua. She earned her bachelor's and master's degrees in chemistry at the University of Padua and graduated in 1973. She moved to Rehovot for her PhD supervised by Meir Lahav on the synthesis of chiral polymers at the Weizmann Institute of Science, which she completed in 1979.

== Research and career ==
After her PhD Addadi joined Jeremy R. Knowles at Harvard University. She started to work on crystal growth during her PhD, and, by chance, met Steve Weiner, who was working on biomineralization. Together they investigated many biominerals, including demonstrating the matrix sheets of crystals in nacre (mother of pearl).

Addadi returned to the Weizmann Institute of Science as an associate professor in 1988. She was promoted to full professor in 1993 and head of the Department of Structural Biology in 1994. She works on ordered crystal arrays and mineralized tissues. She has investigated the relationship between acidic proteins with biominerals including calcite and apatite. She demonstrated that macromolecules in the shells of mollusks determine the polymorphism of aragonite and calcite. She went on to establish the role of amorphous calcium carbonate in biomineralization. Addadi identified that mollusks build their shells using hydrophobic silk gels, aspartic acid, acid-rich proteins, and an amorphous precursor.

Addadi is interested in how macromolecules nucleate oriented growth and how morphology changes through interactions with surfaces. Addadi looks at the structures of crystal protein composites. She demonstrated that protein intercalation into the lattice can change the texture and mechanical properties of the material. She showed that immunoglobulins and serum albumins can selectively adhere to the surfaces of crystals and nucleate further crystal growth. This can help to understand how diseases such as gout, osteoarthritis, and atherosclerosis form crystals in body fluids. Addadi studies the formation pathways of these mineralized tissues in foraminifera and zebrafish bone. She received the ETH Zurich Prelog Medal in 1998. She was dean of the Faculty of Chemistry from 2001 to 2004.

Her work has considered molecular recognition at crystal interfaces. When introduced to an organism, crystals appear as highly structured, repetitive macromolecular substrates. She studies monoclonal antibodies that are sensitive to specific crystalline organisations. She also investigates cross-talk between crystals and the biological environments they exist in.

Her inaugural year article for Proceedings of the National Academy of Sciences of the United States of America (PNAS) considered the formation of cholesterol crystals in atherosclerosis. She demonstrated that in cell culture, crystals adopt a similar shape to the atherosclerotic plaque that forms in cells, because they are formed from the same cholesterol. The crystals adopt helical or tubular forms. Addadi used stochastic optical reconstruction microscopy and soft X-ray tomography to identify the cholesterol inside cells.

== Awards and honours ==
- 1986 Weizmann Institute of Science Ernst David Bergmann Prize in Chemistry
- 1989 Israel Chemical Society Annual Award
- 1996 NIDR Prize for Distinguished Scientists
- 1998 ETH Zurich Prelog Medal in Stereochemistry
- 2006 Technion – Israel Institute of Technology Kolthoff Prize
- 2009 Israel Chemical Society Prize for Excellence
- 2011 Royal Swedish Academy of Sciences Gregori Aminoff Prize for Crystallography
- 2017 Elected to the National Academy of Sciences
- 2018 ETH Zurich Honorary Doctorate
- 2021 Israel Chemical Society Gold Medal
