= Alice Vrielink =

Canadian-Australian structural biologist

- Education: University of London
- Scientific career
- Thesis: The crystal structure determination of cholesterol oxidase (1989)
- Doctoral advisor: David Mervyn Blow

Alice Vrielink is a Canadian-Australian structural biologist and Professor of Structural Biology in the School of Molecular Sciences at the University of Western Australia. She is known for her work determining the structures of macromolecules such as enzymes and nucleic acids.

== Education ==
Vrielink earned a Bachelor of Science in Chemistry and Masters of Science in Physical Chemistry at the University of Calgary in Canada. For her master's research she worked on ligands of angiotensin, a hormone involved in regulating blood pressure. She received a PhD in 1989 from the University of London where she worked on the structure of cholesterol oxidase. She also has a Diploma in Crystallography from the Imperial College of Science and Technology, London.

== Career ==
Vrielink was an Assistant and Associate Professor at McGill University in Canada from 1994 to 2001. From 2000 until 2007, she served as a Research Professor at the University of California, Santa Cruz and then joined the faculty at University of Western Australia as Professor of Structural Biology in 2007.

Vrielink was a member of the 2014 National Committee on Crystallography. She is a past president of the Society of Crystallographers of Australia and New Zealand (SCANZ).

== Research ==
Vrielink conducts research in protein biochemistry and crystallography with a focus on understanding the structural determinants governing enzyme chemistry. Vrielink's early research centered on the three-dimensional structure of the enzyme cholesterol oxidase first in Brevibacterium and then in Streptomyces.

She has been involved in projects that have established the structure of compounds including L-amino-acid oxidase, prions, and snake venom. In 2017, she mapped the molecular structure of EptA, a protein that shields superbugs from antibiotics. This work has been covered by the BBC, ABC, Times Higher Education, The West Australian, and Particle. Subsequent work on EptA has revealed why it may be a good target for drug development.

== Selected publications ==
- Vrielink, A.; Rüger, W.; Driessen, H.P.; Freemont, P.S. (1 August 1994). "Crystal structure of the DNA modifying enzyme beta-glucosyltransferase in the presence and absence of the substrate uridine diphosphoglucose". The EMBO Journal. 13 (15): 3413–3422. doi:10.1002/j.1460-2075.1994.tb06646.x. ISSN 0261-4189. PMC 395243. PMID 8062817.
- Vrielink, Alice; Lloyd, Lesley F; Blow, David M (5 June 1991). "Crystal structure of cholesterol oxidase from Brevibacterium sterolicum refined at 1.8 Å resolution". Journal of Molecular Biology. 219 (3): 533–554. doi:10.1016/0022-2836(91)90192-9. ISSN 0022-2836. PMID 2051487.
- Pawelek, P. D.; Cheah, J.; Coulombe, R.; Macheroux, P.; Ghisla, S.; Vrielink, A. (15 August 2000). "The structure of L-amino acid oxidase reveals the substrate trajectory into an enantiomerically conserved active site". The EMBO Journal. 19 (16): 4204–4215. doi:10.1093/emboj/19.16.4204. ISSN 0261-4189. PMC 302035. PMID 10944103.
- Burns, Colin S.; Aronoff-Spencer, Eliah; Dunham, Christine M.; Lario, Paula; Avdievich, Nikolai I.; Antholine, William E.; Olmstead, Marilyn M.; Vrielink, Alice; Gerfen, Gary J.; Peisach, Jack; Scott, William G. (1 March 2002). "Molecular Features of the Copper Binding Sites in the Octarepeat Domain of the Prion Protein". Biochemistry. 41 (12): 3991–4001. doi:10.1021/bi011922x. ISSN 0006-2960. PMC 2905306. PMID 11900542.
