= SUT =

Sut is a demon in Islam.

SUT may refer to:

- Hummer H2 SUT, a pickup truck variant of the Hummer H2
- Shaanxi University of Technology, China
- Sharif University of Technology, Iran
- Shenyang University of Technology, China
- Society for Underwater Technology
- Solar updraft tower, a solar power plant
- Sport Utility Truck
- Suranaree University of Technology, Thailand
- System under test in software testing
- IATA airport code for Sumbawanga Airport
- London Underground station code for Sudbury Town tube station, England
- Sutherland, historic county in Scotland, Chapman code
- TV Shizuoka, a Japanese commercial broadcaster
- Phoenix SUT, an electric pickup based on the SsangYong Actyon Sports
