= Olex =

Olex may refer to:

- Olex, Oregon, an unincorporated community in Gilliam County, Oregon, United States
- Olex2, software for crystallographic research
- OLEX (company) (Aktiengesellschaft für österreichische und ungarische Mineralölprodukte), a former Austrian-Hungarian oil company

== See also ==
- Olexandr
