= Richard Henderson (biologist) =

British biologist (born 1945)

Richard Henderson CH FRS FMedSci HonFRSC
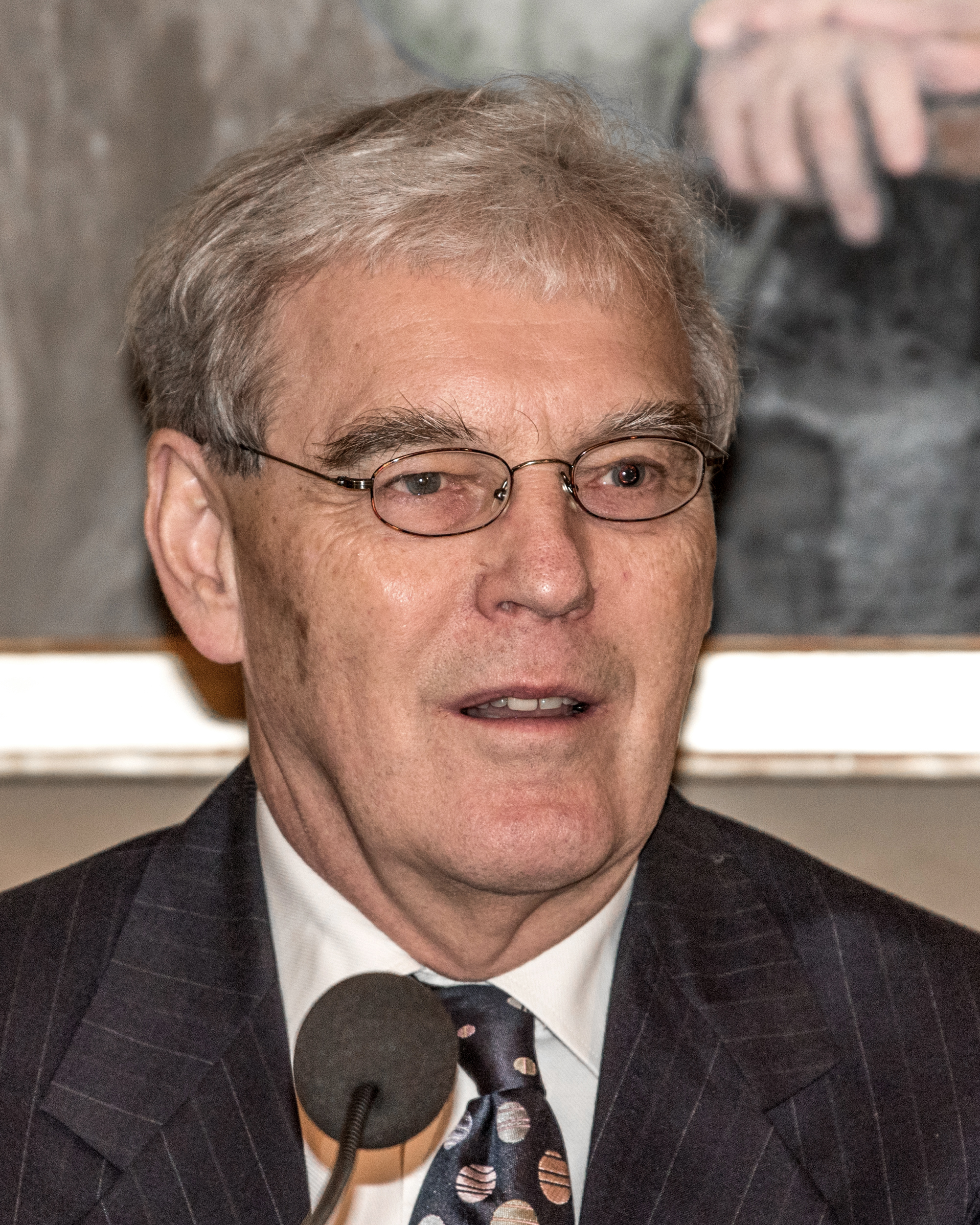
- Henderson during Nobel Prize press conference in Stockholm in 2017
- Born: 19 July 1945 (age 81); Edinburgh, Scotland
- Education: University of Edinburgh; Corpus Christi College, Cambridge
- Known for: Cryo-electron microscopy
- Awards: Louis-Jeantet Prize (1993); Copley Medal (2016); Nobel Prize in Chemistry (2017)
- Scientific career
- Fields: Structural biology; Cryo-electron microscopy; Electron crystallography
- Workplaces: Laboratory of Molecular Biology; Yale University
- Thesis: X-Ray Analysis of α-chymotrysin: Substrate and Inhibitor Binding (1970)
- Doctoral advisor: David Mervyn Blow

Richard Henderson (born 19 July 1945) is a British molecular biologist and biophysicist and pioneer in the field of electron microscopy of biological molecules. Henderson shared the Nobel Prize in Chemistry in 2017 with Jacques Dubochet and Joachim Frank. "Thanks to his work, we can look at individual atoms of living nature, thanks to cryo-electron microscopes we can see details without destroying samples, and for this he won the Nobel Prize in Chemistry."

== Education ==
Henderson was educated at Newcastleton primary school, Hawick High School and Boroughmuir High School. His father was a baker. He went on to study Physics at the University of Edinburgh graduating with a BSc degree in Physics, 1st Class honours in 1966. He then commenced postgraduate study at Corpus Christi College, Cambridge, and obtained his PhD degree from the University of Cambridge in 1969.

== Career and research ==
=== Research ===
Henderson worked on the structure and mechanism of chymotrypsin for his doctorate under the supervision of David Mervyn Blow at the MRC Laboratory of Molecular Biology. His interest in membrane proteins led to him working on voltage-gated sodium channels as a post-doctoral researcher at Yale University. Returning to the MRC Laboratory of Molecular Biology in 1975, Henderson worked with Nigel Unwin to study the structure of the membrane protein bacteriorhodopsin by electron microscopy. A seminal paper in Nature by Henderson and Unwin (1975) established a low resolution structural model for bacteriorhodopsin showing the protein to consist of seven transmembrane helices. This paper was important for a number of reasons, not the least of which was that it showed that membrane proteins had well defined structures and that transmembrane alpha-helices could occur. After 1975 Henderson continued to work on the structure of bacteriorhodopsin without Unwin. In 1990 Henderson published an atomic model of bacteriorhodopsin by electron crystallography in the Journal of Molecular Biology. This model was the second ever atomic model of a membrane protein. The techniques Henderson developed for electron crystallography are still in use.

Together with Chris Tate, Henderson helped develop conformational thermostabilisation: a method that allows any protein to be made more stable while still holding a chosen conformation of interest. This method has been critical in crystallising and solving the structures of several G protein–coupled receptors (GPCRs). With help from the charity LifeArc, Henderson and Tate founded the MRC start-up company, Heptares Therapeutics Ltd (HTL) in 2007. HTL continues to develop new drugs targeting medically important GPCRs linked to a wide range of human diseases.

In the last few years, Henderson has returned to hands-on research focusing on single particle electron microscopy. Having been an early proponent of the idea that single particle electron microscopy is capable of determining atomic resolution models for proteins, explained in a 1995 paper in Quarterly Reviews of Biophysics. Henderson aims to be able to routinely obtain atomic structures without crystals. He has made seminal contributions to many of the approaches used in single particle electron microscopy, including pioneering the development of direct electron detectors that recently allowed single particle cryo-electron microscopy to achieve its goals.

=== Post-docs and PhD students ===
Although Henderson has typically worked independently, he has trained a number of scientists who have gone on to independent research careers. These scientists include:

- David Agard, since 1983 at UCSF
- Per Bullough, since 1994 at the University of Sheffield
- Nikolaus Grigorieff, since 2018 at the RNA Therapeutics Institute, UMass Chan Medical School
- Reinhard Grisshammer, since 2017 at the National Cancer Institute
- Edmund Kunji, since 2000 at MRC Mitochondrial Biology Unit, University of Cambridge
- Peter Rosenthal, since 2015 at the Francis Crick Institute
- John Rubinstein, since 2006 at The Hospital for Sick Children, Toronto
- Gebhard Schertler, since 2010 at ETH Paul Scherrer Institute
- Christopher Tate, since 1992 at MRC Laboratory of Molecular Biology
- Vinzenz Unger, since 2010 at Northwestern University

=== Other positions ===
Henderson has worked at the Medical Research Council Laboratory of Molecular Biology (MRC LMB) in Cambridge since 1973, and was its director between 1996 and 2006. He was also a visiting professor at the Miller Institute of the University of California, Berkeley in Spring 1993. He is currently a mentor for the Academy of Medical Sciences Mentoring Scheme. Outside academia, he lists his interests as hill walking in Scotland, kayaking and drinking good wine.

== Awards and honours ==
- 1978 Awarded the William Bate Hardy Prize
- 1983 Elected a Fellow of the Royal Society (FRS)
- 1984 Awarded the Sir Hans Krebs Medal by the Federation of European Biochemical Societies
- 1998 Elected a Foreign Associate of the US National Academy of Sciences
- 1981 Awarded the Ernst-Ruska Prize for Electron Microscopy
- 1991 Awarded the Lewis S. Rosenstiel Award
- 1993 Awarded the Louis-Jeantet Prize for Medicine
- 1998 Elected as a founder Fellow of the Academy of Medical Sciences (FMedSci)
- 1999 Awarded the Gregori Aminoff prize (together with Nigel Unwin)
- 2003 Honorary Fellow of the Corpus Christi College, Cambridge
- 2003 Honorary Member of the British Biophysical Society
- 2005 Awarded Distinguished Scientist Award and Fellow, Microscopy Society of America
- 2008 Honorary Doctor of Science degree from the University of Edinburgh
- 2016 Awarded the Copley Medal of the Royal Society
- 2016 Awarded the Alexander Hollaender Award in Biophysics
- 2017 Awarded the Wiley Prize
- 2017 Honorary Fellow of the Royal Society of Chemistry (HonFRSC)
- 2017 Awarded the Nobel Prize in Chemistry together with Jacques Dubochet and Joachim Frank "for developing cryo-electron microscopy for the high-resolution structure determination of biomolecules in solution"
- 2018 Appointed Member of the Order of the Companions of Honour (CH) in the Queen's Birthday Honours for services to electron microscopy of biological molecules
- 2018 Awarded the Royal Medal of the Royal Society of Edinburgh
- 2019 Honorary Doctor of Science degree from the University of Leeds

== Interviews ==
He was interviewed by Jim Al-Khalili for The Life Scientific, first broadcast on BBC Radio 4 in February 2018.
