= Alwyn Jones =

Alwyn Jones may refer to:

- Alwyn Jones (biophysicist) (born 1947), Welsh biophysicist and professor at the University of Uppsala
- Alwyn Jones (athlete) (born 1985), Australian triple jumper
- Alwyn Rice Jones (1934–2007), Archbishop of Wales, 1991–1999
