= ShelXle =

GUI for SHELXL

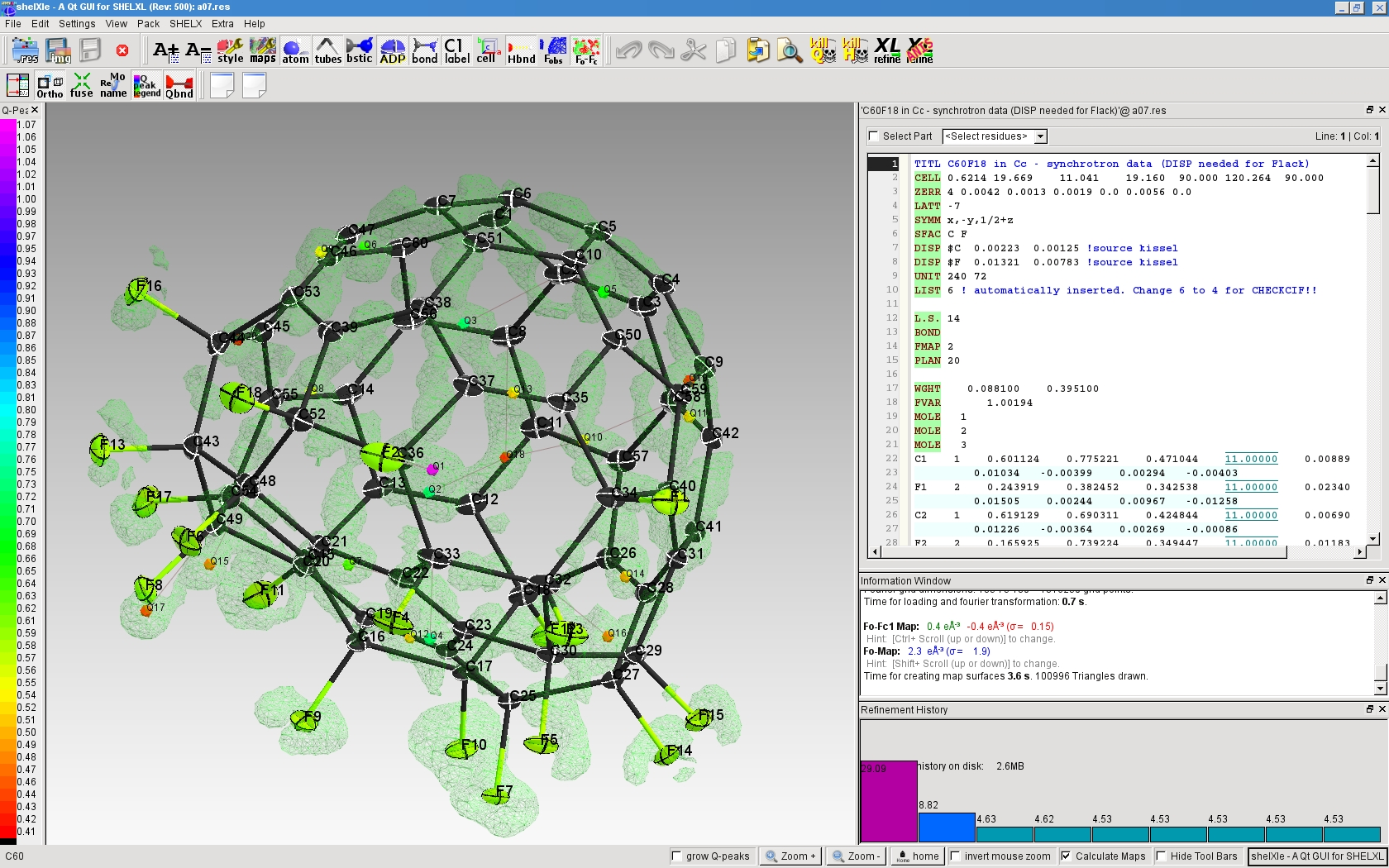
- the ShelXle main window with a structure of C60F18
- Developer: Christian B. Hübschle
- Release: 2011
- Stable release: 1.0.1818 / 26 March 2026; 2 months ago
- Written in: C++
- Operating system: Windows, Linux, macOS
- Type: Molecular modelling
- License: GNU Lesser General Public License
- Website: http://www.shelxle.org/index.php

The program ShelXle is a graphical user interface for the structure refinement program SHELXL. ShelXle combines an editor with syntax highlighting for the SHELXL-associated .ins (input) and .res (output) files with an interactive graphical display for visualization of a three-dimensional structure including the electron density (Fo) and difference density (Fo-Fc) maps.

== Overview ==
ShelXle can display electron density maps like the macromolecular program Coot but is more intended for smaller molecules. A number of excellent graphical user interfaces (GUIs) exist for small molecule crystal structure refinement with SHELX (e.g., WINGX, Olex2, XSEED, PLATON and SYSTEM-S, and the Bruker programs XP and XSHELL)

ShelXle is free software, distributed under the GNU LGPL. It is available from the ShelXle website or from SourceForge. Binaries are available for Windows, macOS and the Linux distributions SuSE, Debian and Ubuntu as well as Arch via the AUR. The Windows binary is distributed with the NSIS Installer.

== Features ==
- Editor featuring syntax highlighting and code completion for the SHELX instructions.
- Clicking on an atom in the structure view sets the text cursor to the line that contains this atom.
- Locating atoms in structure view from the editor.
- Rename mode with support of residues and disordered parts and free variables.

== Program architecture ==
ShelXle uses the Qt (framework). It is written entirely in C++ and does not use any scripting language. For the refinement it calls the external binary of SHELXL which might also be SHELXH, SHELXLMP from George M. Sheldrick or XL from Bruker.

== SHELX ==
SHELX is developed by George M. Sheldrick since the late 1960s. Important releases are SHELX76 and SHELX97. It is still developed but releases are usually after ten years of testing. Academic users can download the SHELX programs freely after registration.
