= SHELX =

Set of crystallography programs

- Developer: George M. Sheldrick
- Written in: Fortran
- Operating system: Windows, Linux, macOS
- Type: Crystallographic software
- License: Freeware for academic use / Commercial license required
- Website: shelx.uni-goettingen.de

SHELX is a suite of programs created by George M. Sheldrick for the determination of crystal structures from single-crystal X-ray and neutron diffraction data. The suite consists of several stand-alone executables that are compatible with modern versions of Linux, Windows, and macOS. The software is available free of charge for academic institutions, while commercial entities are required to pay for a license.

The significance of the software is highlighted by its high citation rate; a primary publication describing the program is the fifth most-cited research paper of the 21st century across all scientific fields.

== Overview ==
The individual programs can be run from graphical user interfaces such as shelXle, Olex2, Oscail, or WinGX. Alternatively, the programs can be run from the command line.

SHELX-2019 includes the following programs:

- SHELXT – For solving crystal structures.
- SHELXS – Contains the classic direct methods for solving crystal structures.
- SHELXL – For the refinement of crystal structures.
- PDB2INS – Generates input files for the refinement of macromolecules with SHELXL.
- CIFTAB and ShredCIF – Allow editing and processing of CIF files.
- SHELXC, SHELXD, and SHELXE – Process structural data from macromolecules.
- AnoDe – Enables the analysis of density maps of macromolecules.

== Program architecture ==
The programs are written in Fortran. Since 2000, parallelized versions of the programs have been developed for multi-CPU computers.
