= Ted Janssen =

Dutch physicist (1936–2017)

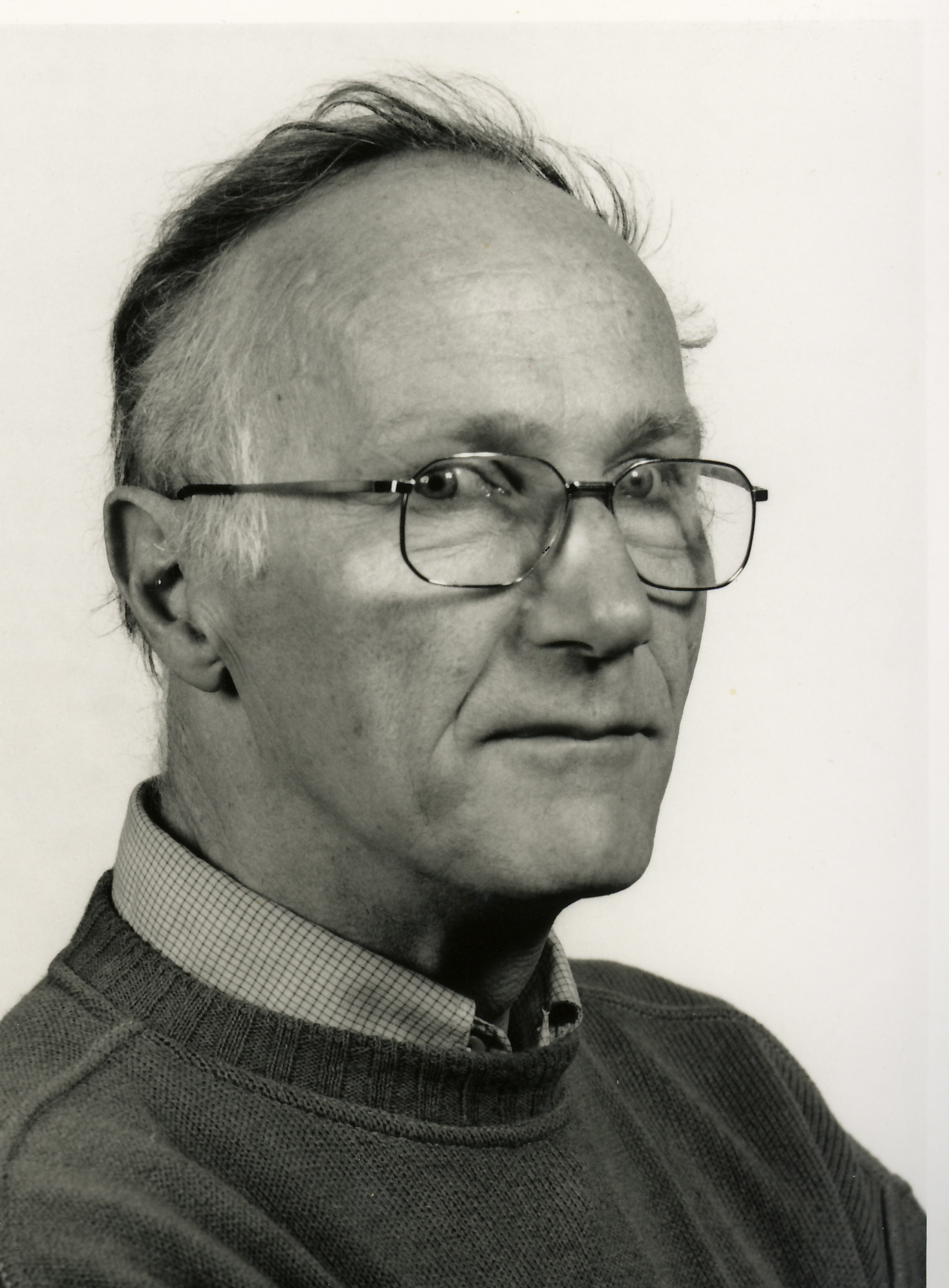
- Born: Theo Willem Jan Marie Janssen; 13 August 1936; Vught, Netherlands
- Died: 29 September 2017 (aged 81); Groesbeek, Netherlands
- Education: Utrecht University
- Known for: One of the founding fathers of N-dimensional crystallography
- Awards: Gregori Aminoff Prize (1998); Ewald Prize (2014)
- Scientific career
- Fields: Theoretical Physics; Solid State Physics and Crystallography
- Institutions: Radboud University Nijmegen
- Doctoral advisor: Léon Van Hove; Aloysio Janner

Theo Willem Jan Marie Janssen (13 August 1936 – 29 September 2017), better known as Ted Janssen, was a Dutch physicist and Full Professor of Theoretical Physics at the Radboud University Nijmegen. Together with Pim de Wolff and Aloysio Janner, he was one of the founding fathers of N-dimensional superspace approach in crystal structure analysis for the description of quasi periodic crystals and modulated structures. For this work he received the Aminoff Prize of the Royal Swedish Academy of Sciences (together with de Wolff and Janner) in 1988 and the Ewald Prize of the International Union of Crystallography (with Janner) in 2014. These achievements were merit of his unique talent, combining a deep knowledge of physics with a rigorous mathematical approach. Their theoretical description of the structure and symmetry of incommensurate crystals using higher dimensional superspace groups also included the quasicrystals that were discovered in 1982 by Dan Schechtman, who received the Nobel Prize in Chemistry in 2011. The Swedish Academy of Sciences explicitly mentioned their work at this occasion.

== Early life and education ==
Ted Janssen was born on August 13, 1936, in Vught, near 's-Hertogenbosch in the Netherlands. Already as a young boy he was fascinated by the sciences. He built radios, set up a chemistry lab in the attic of his parental home, was an avid bird watcher and he built his own telescopes. He remembered high school as ‘not very inspiring’ and he passed all exams without much effort, but viewed it as a time that truly formed him. Instead of spending time on homework he studied the history and philosophy of science and was very interested in astronomy and astrophysics.

During his high school years he also developed a deep appreciation of literature and music. Later he added the visual arts, ballet, and architecture to that list. The enjoyment of the arts was vital to Ted. He called it essential components of life. He started playing the piano, harpsichord and cello in his early twenties. Too late to become an accomplished musician, but it brought him great joy.

In 1954 he started college in Utrecht, studying mathematics and physics with minors in chemistry and astronomy. He again showed his interest in a wide variety of topics by attending lectures in ethics, philosophy, music and sculpture. After his candidate degree he concentrated on theoretical physics, but always included a deep understanding of mathematics in his work.

After studying theoretical physics in Utrecht University Ted graduated under Leon van Hove with his doctoral dissertation ‘the classical limit of quantum mechanical diagram expansions’ and he was offered the opportunity to present it at an international conference in Utrecht on ‘Many-body Problems’. No less than six Nobel laureates (Yang, Lee, Prigogine, Anderson, Cooper and Schrieffer) were in the audience for Ted’s first presentation, which led to his first publication as well: ’On the classical limit of the diagram expansion in quantum statistics’ by T.W.J.M. Janssen. All his later publications were published as T. Janssen or Ted Janssen.

After his doctoral exam in 1960 Ted worked for several years with professors Theo Ruijgrok, Tini Veltman, and John Tjon in Utrecht. Earlier he developed a friendship with co-student and co-worker Geert Fast. Geert’s promotor van Hove moved from Utrecht to CERN in Geneva and Geert asked Ted to keep an eye on his little sister, Loes Fast, who was studying veterinary medicine in Utrecht. Ted quickly developed strong feelings for Loes and in 1965 they got married.

In 1965, he became the first PhD student of Aloysio Janner at the Catholic University Nijmegen and started on the work that resulted in his PhD thesis, Crystallographic Groups in Space and Time, in 1968, thereby already providing the theoretical basis of what would become the superspace approach.

== Career ==
After his promotion Ted Janssen got a position in Nijmegen at the department of Theoretical Solid State Physics. He immediately was given teaching responsibilities. In the years that followed Ted taught many classes, including electrodynamics, classical mechanics, quantum mechanics, complex functions, crystallographic groups, group theory for physicists, chaos theory, soft modes and solid state physics.

Ted was always interested in international collaboration and taught ‘crystallographic groups’ for 6 months in Leuven in 1969. In 1971 Ted accepted an invite from professor Baltensberger to come to the ETH in Zürich for one year. Baltensberger organized weekly meetings between theoretical and experimental physicists. Ted ever since made it a habit to bring theoretical and experimental physicists together on a regular basis.

Back in Nijmegen Ted was promoted to associate professor in 1972 and he continued working with Aloysio Janner and Li Ching Chen on space-time symmetry of electromagnetic fields and independently on PUA (projective unitary/anti-unitary) representations. In 1972 Aloysio and Ted also started their long collaboration with Pim de Wolff. Together with Aloysio Janner and Pim de Wolff he was one of the founders of the higher dimensional superspace approach in crystal structure analysis for the description of quasiperiodic crystals and modulated structures. This collaboration and its results received international recognition in 1998 with the Aminoff Prize from the Swedish Academy of Science. The award ceremony was followed by a symposium and the speakers were Aloysio Janner, Ted Janssen, Gervais Chapuis, Mike Glazer, Borje Johansson, Sander van Smaalen, Vaclav Petrcek and Reine Wallenberg.

In 1973 and 1975 Ted and Aloysio organized conferences on ‘Group Theoretical Methods in Physics’ in Nijmegen. These are small conferences that attract both mathematicians and physicists. The series still exists. In 1993 Ted was appointed as professor at Utrecht University and in 1994 he took Aloysio’s position in Nijmegen after Aloysio retired. Also in 1994 Ted organized the conference Dyproso 1994 (Dynamic Properties of Solids) in Lunteren.

In 1987 Ted joined the board of EMF (European Meeting on Ferro- electricity) and a few years later also the IMF (International Meeting on Ferroelectricity). Ted organized EMF-8 in 1995, in Nijmegen. In 1997 he joined the board of Aperiodic (Modulated Structures, Polytypes and Quasicrystals) and he organized Aperiodic-2000, again in Nijmegen. Ted also was a board member of ICQ, NVK (Nederlandse Vereniging voor Kristallografie – Dutch Union of Crystallography), LOTN (Collaboration of Dutch Institutes for Theoretical Physics), and the Dutch organization of Fundamental Research in Solid State Physics.

Ted attended many conferences and was often traveling. In the earlier years his wife Loes worked as a veterinarian and took care of the children, but once all children had left the house Loes would join Ted on many of his travels. Ted spent time as visiting lector or professor in Leuven (1969), Zürich (1971-1972), Dijon (1987), Paris, Orsay, Palaiseau (1992), Gif-sur-Yvette (1993), Grenoble (1986 and 1990), Marseille (2001), Nagoya (1992), Lausanne (2003), Beer Sheva (2003) en Sendai (2004-2005 and 2013).

In 2014 Aloyiso and Ted received a second award, the Ewald Prize, one of the most prestigious prizes in crystallography, of the International Union of Crystallography during the IUCr conference in Montreal.

== Death ==
Ted Janssen died in Groesbeek, Netherlands, on September 29, 2017, after a short and devastating struggle with leukemia. He did however work until the last day, finishing his edits for the second edition of the book "Aperiodic structures: from modulated structures to quasicrystals" that was published in 2018.

== Selected bibliography ==
=== Books ===
- Janssen, T. (1973). Crystallographic groups. London: North-Holland Pub. Co. ISBN 0-444-10436-4. OCLC 736907.
- Group theoretical methods in physics : fourth international colloquium, Nijmegen, 1975. A. Janner, T. Janssen, Michael Boon. Berlin: Springer-Verlag. 1976. ISBN 0-387-07789-8. OCLC 2331780.
- Janssen, T.; Chapuis, Gervais; de Boissieu, Marc (2018). Aperiodic crystals : from modulated phases to quasicrystals : structure and properties (2 ed.). Oxford, United Kingdom. ISBN 978-0-19-255781-0. OCLC 1049150242.

=== Papers ===
- Janner A, Janssen T (1977). "Symmetry of periodically distorted crystals". Phys. Rev. B. 15 (2): 643–658. Bibcode:1977PhRvB..15..643J. doi:10.1103/PhysRevB.15.643.
- Janner A, Janssen T (1980). "Symmetry of incommensurate crystal phases". Acta Crystallogr. A. 36 (3): 399–408, 408–415. doi:10.1107/S0567739480000885.
- de Wolff PM, Janssen T, Janner A (1981). "The superspace groups for incommensurate crystal structures with one-dimensional modulation". Acta Crystallographica A. 37 (5): 62–636. Bibcode:1981AcCrA..37..625D. doi:10.1107/S0567739481001447.
- Janssen T, Tjon JA (1982). "Microscopic model for incommensurate crystal phases". Phys. Rev. B. 25 (6): 3767–3785. Bibcode:1982PhRvB..25.3767J. doi:10.1103/PhysRevB.25.3767.
- T. Janssen (1986). "Crystallography of quasi-crystals". Acta Crystallogr. A. 42 (4): 261–271. Bibcode:1986AcCrA..42..261J. doi:10.1107/S0108767386099324.
- Janssen T, Janner A (1987). "Incommensurability in crystals". Adv. Phys. 36 (5): 519–624. Bibcode:1987AdPhy..36..519J. doi:10.1080/00018738700101052.
- T. Janssen (1988). "Aperiodic crystals: a contradictio in terminis?". Phys. Rep. 168 (2): 55–113. Bibcode:1988PhR...168...55J. doi:10.1016/0370-1573(88)90017-8.
- Janssen T, Janner A, Looyenga-Vos A, de Wolff PM (1992). A.J.C. Wilson (ed.). "Commensurate and incommensurate modulated structures". International Tables for Crystallography. C: 797–836.
- Quilichini M, Janssen T (1997). "Phonon excitations in quasicrystals". Rev. Mod. Phys. 69 (69): 277–314. Bibcode:1997RvMP...69..277Q. doi:10.1103/RevModPhys.69.277. hdl:2066/28029. S2CID 122723882.
