= Michael Woolfson =

British physicist and planetary scientist (1927–2019)

Michael Mark Woolfson (9 January 1927 – 23 December 2019) was a British physicist and planetary scientist. His research interests were in the fields of x-ray crystallography, biophysics, colour vision and the formation of stars and planets.

== Academia ==
He was educated at Jesus College, Oxford and received his PhD from UMIST, where he was supervised by Henry Lipson. He was a research assistant at UMIST 1950-52 and at Cavendish Laboratory, University of Cambridge, 1952–54. He was an ICI Fellow, University of Cambridge, 1954–55. At UMIST he was a lecturer, 1955–61, and a Reader, 1961–65. Between 1959–60, he went on sabbatical working as a consultant at IBM, White Plains. He was Professor of Theoretical Physics, 1965-94 University of York and head of the Department of Physics, 1982–87. He served as the first provost of Goodricke College between 1968 and 1972. He was professor emeritus.

== DIAMOND Light Source ==
In November 1991, the Science and Engineering Research Council (SERC) set up a panel, which was chaired by Woolfson, to review synchrotron facilities in the UK. In April 1993, the “Woolfson Report” was published. Amongst the recommendations made in the report was the setting up of a new medium energy X-ray source to replace the existing Synchrotron Radiation Source, which was then located at Daresbury in Cheshire, UK. This new source was called the Diamond Light Source and, after some debate, it was decided to locate this source at the Rutherford Appleton Laboratory (RAL) in Oxfordshire, UK

== Honours ==
He became an Honorary Fellow of Jesus College in 1999. He was elected a Fellow of the Royal Society in 1984 and was also a fellow of the Royal Astronomical Society and the Institute of Physics. He was president and Honorary Vice-President of the Yorkshire Philosophical Society.

He was awarded the Royal Society Hughes Medal in 1986, the Patterson Award from the American Crystallographic Association in 1990, the Gregori Aminoff Prize from the Royal Swedish Academy of Sciences in 1992, the Dorothy Hodgkin Prize by the British Crystallographic Association in 1997 and the Ewald Prize by the International Union of Crystallography in 2002.

== Publications ==
He has published papers and books on a wide range of subjects, including X-ray crystallography, materials science, planet formation, mathematics, imaging, time, probability and statistics, colour vision, and astrophysics. Woolfson was active in research and scientific writing for nearly 70 years; his first paper was published in 1951 and his last book on stars was published in July 2019, a few months before he died.
