= Nikolaus Grigorieff =

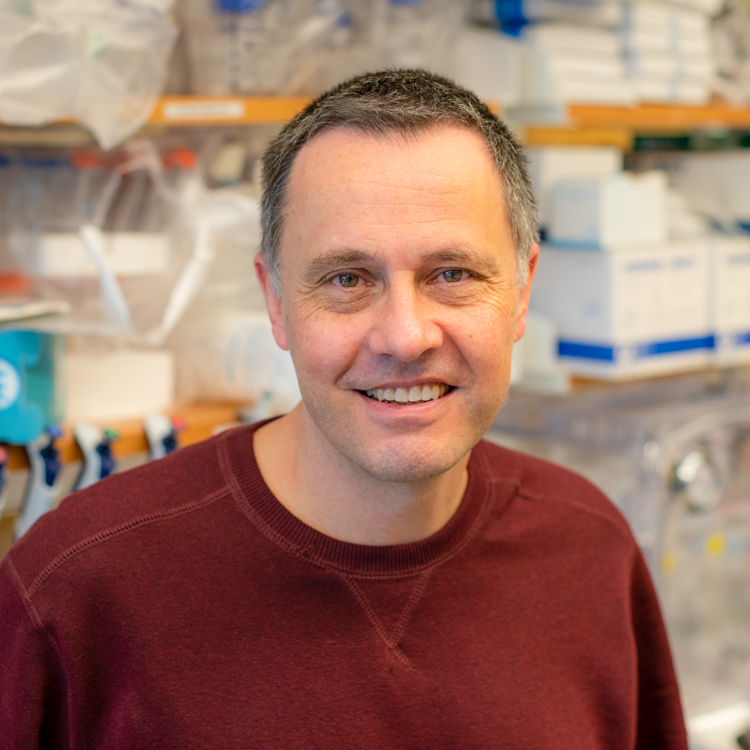
- Known for: Cryogenic Electron Microscopy (Cryo-EM)
- Spouse: Maria Gianferrari
- Scientific career
- Fields: Structural biology, biophysics
- Workplaces: UMass Chan Medical School Janelia Research Campus (2013-2018) Brandeis University (1999-2013)
- Website: https://grigoriefflab.umassmed.edu/

Nikolaus Grigorieff is a structural biologist and biophysicist and professor at the University of Massachusetts Chan Medical School, where he is a member of the RNA Therapeutics Institute. He is also an investigator of the Howard Hughes Medical Institute (HHMI) and a member of the United States National Academy of Sciences. His research focuses on determining the three-dimensional structures of proteins and macromolecular assemblies using high-resolution cryogenic electron microscopy (cryo-EM), as well as the development of computational methods for cryo-EM image processing.

== Academic career ==
Grigorieff earned his M.S. in semiconductor physics in 1990 and Ph.D. in cryo-EM in 1993, both from the University of Bristol (UK), where he conducted thesis research with David Cherns focused on semiconductor devices and their analysis with the electron microscope (EM). He subsequently completed postdoctoral training at the Medical Research Council in Cambridge (UK) with Richard Henderson on 2D crystals of bacteriorhodopsin. Grigorieff started his own lab at Brandeis University in 1999 as assistant professor, promoted to associate professor in 2004, and Full Professor in 2006. He became an HHMI investigator in 2000.

In 2013, Grigorieff moved his lab to Janelia Research Campus, and then to UMass Chan Medical School in 2018 where he became a professor in the RNA Therapeutics Institute. Dr. Grigorieff has over 30,600 citations on Google Scholar.

== Research contributions ==
Grigorieff's laboratory studies the structure and function of proteins and protein complexes using cryo-EM. His work has addressed large macromolecular assemblies associated with RNA biology, including the spliceosome and the ribosome with collaborator Andrei A. Korostelev and others, as well as membrane proteins such as ion channels and receptors. His research has also examined helical filaments, including microtubules and amyloid structures.

In addition to structural studies, Grigorieff has contributed to the development of computational and methodological advances in cryo-EM, including CTFFIND5, Frealign, cisTEM, Unblur, all designed as open-source software. He played a role in advancing the use of dose-fractionated “movie” recording in cryo-EM to correct for beam-induced motion, a methodological improvement that contributed to significant gains in achievable resolution in the field.

More recently, in collaboration with researchers at the Janelia Research Campus, he has worked on the development of an in situ cryo-EM approach known as two-dimensional template matching (2DTM). This method is designed to enable the detection and localization of macromolecules within cellular cryo-EM images. Ongoing work in his laboratory includes applications of 2DTM for evaluating sample integrity, visualizing ligand–protein interactions, extending cryo-EM methods to smaller molecular complexes, and analyzing conformational variability in solution.

== Awards and honors ==
- Research fellowship from the Humboldt Foundation (2004–2005)
- Paper of the Year Award, Journal of Structural Biology (2015)
- Election to the National Academy of Sciences, USA (2021)
