= Pieter Maarten de Wolff =

Dutch physicist and crystallographer (1919–1998)

Pieter Maarten de Wolff (23 July 1919 – 10 April 1998), or Pim de Wolff was a Dutch physicist, crystallographer, and professor at Delft University of Technology. He was one of the founders of N-dimensional crystallography together with Ted Janssen and Aloysio Janner.

== Education and career ==
De Wolff was born in the Dutch East Indies as the youngest of four children. His father was Maarten de Wolff, a civil engineering engineer, and his mother was Hermine Elizabeth van Vliet. From 1929 the family lived in Medan, Sumatra, where he went to school. In 1932 they returned to the Netherlands and he went to the Hogere Burgerschool in The Hague.

He studied physics at Delft University of Technology in 1936, where he studied X-ray powder diffraction in his graduation research. He obtained his engineering degree in 1941, during Nazi Germany's occupation of the Netherlands, just before the Nazis closed the college in Delft. Unable to continue his studies, de Wolff, through the intercession of Henk Dorgelo, went to work at the Technical Physics Department of the Netherlands Organisation for Applied Scientific Research. In 1951 de Wolff obtained his PhD from Henk Dorgelo with a thesis entitled Contributions to the theory and practice of quantitative determinations by the X-ray powder diffraction method.

In 1958 de Wolff became professor of theoretical and applied physics at the Delft University of Technology, a position he held until his retirement in 1984. He was chairman of the Applied Physics Department (1971–1973) and of the Physics Practicum department (1974–1980). He also chaired the Committee on the Nomenclature of Symmetry at the International Union of Crystallography.

== Honors and awards ==
De Wolff's honors include receiving the Gilles Holst Medal of the Royal Netherlands Academy of Arts and Sciences (KNAW) for the Guinier–de Wolff Camera in 1976. Three years later, in 1979, he became member of the KNAW. De Wolff received the Abraham Gottlob Werner Medal of the German Mineralogical Society in 1986, and a distinguished fellowship award from the International Center for Diffraction Data in 1994. He received the Gregori Aminoff Prize from the Royal Swedish Academy of Sciences in 1998. He was too ill to go to Stockholm to receive the medal from the Swedish king. He died ten days later.
