= Zhang Ping (engineer) =

Chinese engineer

- Born: April 1959 (age 67); Chenggu County, Shaanxi, China
- Education: Shaanxi University of Technology; Northwestern Polytechnical University; Beijing University of Posts and Telecommunications
- Scientific career
- Fields: Wireless
- Workplaces: Beijing University of Posts and Telecommunications

Chinese name
- Traditional Chinese: 張平
- Simplified Chinese: 张平
Transcriptions
Standard Mandarin
- Hanyu Pinyin: Zhāng Píng

Zhang Ping (Chinese: 张平; born April 1959) is a Chinese engineer specializing in Wireless. He an academician of the Chinese Academy of Engineering (CAE) and currently serving as a professor and doctoral supervisor at Beijing University of Posts and Telecommunications. He is a member of the Chinese Peasants' and Workers' Democratic Party.

== Biography ==
Zhang was born in Chenggu County, Shaanxi, in April 1959. After the resumption of National College Entrance Examination, he was accepted to Shaanxi University of Technology. After completing his master's degree in signal circuit and system at Northwestern Polytechnical University, he attended Beijing University of Posts and Telecommunications where he obtained his Doctor of Engineering degree in 1990. After graduation, he taught at the university.

== Honours and awards ==
- 2018 Science and Technology Progress Award of the Ho Leung Ho Lee Foundation
- 2018 Fellow of the Institute of Electrical and Electronics Engineers (IEEE)
- November 22, 2019 Member of the Chinese Academy of Engineering (CAE)
