= Julia Mahamid =

Biologist and microscopist

- Education: Technion – Israel Institute of Technology (BSc); Weizmann Institute of Science (MSc, PhD)
- Known for: cryo-electron tomography
- Scientific career
- Fields: Structural Biology; Cell Biology
- Workplaces: Max Planck Institute of Biochemistry; European Molecular Biology Laboratory
- Thesis: Structural Investigation of Bone Mineralization Processes in the Zebrafish Fin and Embryonic Mouse Models (2010)
- Academic advisors: Lia Addadi; Steve Weiner; Wolfgang Baumeister
- Website: Mahamid Group

Julia Mahamid is a cell biologist, structural biologist, and electron microscopist at the European Molecular Biology Laboratory in Heidelberg, Germany, who utilizes biomolecular condensates and advanced cellular cryo-electron tomography to enhance the comprehension of the functional organization of the cytoplasm. She leads the Mahamid Group.

== Education ==
Mahamid completed her Biology studies at the Technion – Israel Institute of Technology, Israel between 2000 and 2003. After that, she pursued her master's degree in chemistry from 2003 to 2005, at the Weizmann Institute of Science, Israel, under the guidance of Lia Addadi in collaboration with Dan Caspi. Later, from 2006 to 2010, Mahamid completed her Ph.D. studies under the supervision of Lia Addadi and Steve Weiner.

== Career and research ==
For her postgraduate work, from 2011 to 2017, Mahamid worked as a postdoctoral researcher the guidance of Wolfgang Baumeister at the Max Planck Institute of Biochemistry in Martinsried, Germany.

Since 2017, Mahamid has been a group leader at the European Molecular Biology Laboratory in Heidelberg, Germany.

Mahamid's research is based on the development of new methods for cryo-electron tomography (cryo-ET), which is a technique for high-resolution 3D imaging of cellular machinery in its natural state. Mahamid played a key role in the development of the cryo-focused ion beam (cryo-FIB) technique that facilitated the creation of "electron-transparent windows" in cells, enabling the observation of cellular structures and macromolecular complexes in their natural environment.

Mahamid is a cell biologist, structural biologist, and electron microscopist. Hence, she is frequently invited to speak at seminars, workshops, and conferences in the field.

Mahamid is on the editorial board of the Journal of Structural Biology.

== Awards and honours ==
- 2017 ERC Starting Grant - 3DCellPhase-
- 2021 Profiled in "Author File," Nature Methods
- 2021 Chan Zuckerberg Initiative Visual Proteomics Imaging Grant
- 2023 EMBO Gold Medal
- 2026: Leibniz Prize
