= David Mervyn Blow =

British biophysicist (1931–2004)

David Mervyn Blow FRS FInstP
- Born: 27 June 1931; Birmingham, England
- Died: 8 June 2004 (aged 72); Appledore, Torridge (near Bideford), Devon, England
- Education: Kingswood School, University of Cambridge (BA, PhD)
- Known for: Haemoglobin; X-ray crystallography
- Spouse: Mavis Sears (m. 1955)
- Awards: Wolf Prize in Chemistry (1987)
- Scientific career
- Fields: Biophysicist
- Workplaces: Massachusetts Institute of Technology; National Institutes of Health; Imperial College London; MRC Laboratory of Molecular Biology
- Thesis: X-ray analysis of haemoglobin : determination of phase angles by isomorphous substitution (1958)
- Doctoral advisor: Max Perutz
- Other academic advisors: Alexander Rich
- Doctoral students: Richard Henderson; Paul Sigler; Alice Vrielink; Gérard Bricogne
- Other notable students: Thomas A. Steitz; Brian Matthews

David Mervyn Blow FRS FInstP (27 June 1931 – 8 June 2004) was a British biophysicist. He was best known for the development of X-ray crystallography, a technique used to determine the molecular structures of tens of thousands of biological molecules.

== Early life and education ==
Blow was born in Birmingham, England. He was educated at Kingswood School in Bath, Somerset and the University of Cambridge where he won a scholarship to Corpus Christi College, Cambridge. His PhD was awarded in 1958 for X-ray analysis of haemoglobin supervised by Max Perutz at the MRC Laboratory of Molecular Biology (LMB).

== Career and research ==
Following graduation from Cambridge, Blow spent two years at the Massachusetts Institute of Technology (MIT) and the National Institutes of Health (NIH) funded by the Fulbright Foundation

In 1954, he met Max Perutz; they began to study a new technique wherein X-rays would be passed through a protein sample at the MRC Laboratory of Molecular Biology. This eventually led to the creation of a three-dimensional structure of haemoglobin. Blow was appointed professor of biophysics at Imperial College London in 1977. His doctoral students include Richard Henderson, Paul Sigler, and Alice Vrielink.

=== Awards and honours ===
Blow was elected a Fellow of the Royal Society (FRS) in 1972. He was awarded the Wolf Prize in Chemistry in 1987.

== Personal life ==
Blow married Mavis Sears in 1955, and they had two children, a son Julian and a daughter Elizabeth. He died of lung cancer at the age of 72, in Appledore, Torridge (near Bideford), Devon.
