= Leslie Leiserowitz =

Israeli chemist and crystallographer

- לסלי ליזרוביץ
- Born: 1934 (age 91–92); Johannesburg
- Awards: Prelog Medal (1987); Gregori Aminoff Prize (2002); Israel Prize (2016); EMET Prize (2018); Wolf Prize in Chemistry (2021)
- Scientific career
- Fields: Chemistry, Crystallography

Leslie Leiserowitz (Hebrew: לסלי ליזרוביץ; born 1934 in Johannesburg, South Africa) is an Israeli chemist and crystallographer.

Leiserowitz studied electrical engineering at the University of Cape Town with a bachelor's degree, and then worked briefly as an electrical engineer and received a master's degree in physics (X-ray crystallography, under Reginald William James). In 1959 he joined the X-ray crystallography department at the Weizmann Institute under Gerhard Schmidt, a student of Dorothy Crowfoot-Hodgkin. The group at the Weizmann Institute has an international reputation in solid-state chemistry. From 1966 to 1968 he set up the organic chemistry X-ray crystallography department at the University of Heidelberg at the invitation of Heinz Staab. There he developed and installed computer programs using the direct method of Nobel Laureates Herbert Hauptman and Jerome Karle.

Back at the Weizmann Institute, Leiserowitz worked on the synthesis of molecules for the investigation of various molecular interactions using X-ray crystallography (crystal engineering). In collaboration with Danish scientists, he also used X-ray diffraction to investigate thin molecular films with synchrotron radiation at DESY in Hamburg.

He and Meir Lahav have been working together for many years on the stereochemical control of crystal formation and growth with targeted impurities.

He is also active in malaria research, studying malaria pathogens using X-ray microscopy (fluorescence images of iron after X-ray exposure in infected red blood cells) and studying antimalarial drugs such as quinoline compounds. The malaria pathogen breaks down hemoglobin, producing a poisonous heme that docks in hemozoin crystals. Quinolines hinder the growth of the hemozoin crystals. Leiserowitz and Ronit Buller modeled the growth of the hemozoin crystals using computer simulation and found that their crystal surfaces were ideal for the docking of the quinolines. This explained the action of certain antimalarial agents and gave direction for improved drug design.

In 1987 he received the Prelog Medal and lecture, in 2002 the Gregori Aminoff Prize together with Meir Lahav, the Israel Prize in 2016, the EMET Prize in 2018 and the Wolf Prize in Chemistry in 2021 jointly with Meir Lahav. In 1997 Leiserowitz was elected to the Leopoldina.

== Publications ==
- Addadi, L.; Berkovitch-Yellin, Z.; Domb, N.; Gati, E.; Lahav, M.; Leiserowitz, L. (1982). "Resolution of conglomerates by stereoselective habit modifications". Nature. 296 (5852): 21–26. Bibcode:1982Natur.296...21A. doi:10.1038/296021a0. S2CID 4262117.
- Berkovitch-Yellin, Z.; Addadi, L.; Idelson, M.; Leiserowitz, L.; Lahav, M. (1982). "Absolute configuration of chiral polar crystals". Nature. 296 (5852): 27–34. Bibcode:1982Natur.296...27B. doi:10.1038/296027a0. S2CID 4318070.
- VAIDA, M.; SHIMON, L. J. W.; WEISINGER-LEWIN, Y.; FROLOW, F.; LAHAV, M.; LEISEROWITZ, L.; MCMULLAN, R. K. (16 September 1988). "The Structure and Symmetry of Crystalline Solid Solutions: A General Revision". Science. 241 (4872): 1475–1479. Bibcode:1988Sci...241.1475V. doi:10.1126/science.241.4872.1475. PMID 17790041. S2CID 38176896.
- Vaida, M.; Shimon, L. J. W.; Van Mil, J.; Ernst-Cabrera, K.; Addadi, L.; Leiserowitz, L.; Lahav, M. (1989). "Absolute asymmetric photochemistry using centrosymmetric single crystals. The host/guest system (E)-cinnamamide/E-cinnamic acid". Journal of the American Chemical Society. 111 (3): 1029–1034. doi:10.1021/ja00185a036.
- WEISSBUCH, I.; ADDADI, L.; LEISEROWITZ, L. (9 August 1991). "Molecular Recognition at Crystal Interfaces". Science. 253 (5020): 637–645. Bibcode:1991Sci...253..637W. doi:10.1126/science.253.5020.637. PMID 17772367. S2CID 42488951.
- Weissbuch, Isabelle; Lahav, Meir; Leiserowitz, Leslie (2003). "Toward Stereochemical Control, Monitoring, and Understanding of Crystal Nucleation". Crystal Growth & Design. 3 (2): 125–150. doi:10.1021/cg0200560.

== Literature ==
• Oral History Interview with Ute Deichmann, Jacques Loeb Centre for History and Philosophy of the Life Sciences, Ben-Gurion Universität, 2013
