= Wolf Prize in Chemistry =

One of six awards by the Wolf Foundation

The Wolf Prize in Chemistry is awarded annually by the Wolf Foundation in Israel. It is one of the six Wolf Prizes established by the Foundation and has been awarded since 1978; the others are in Agriculture, Mathematics, Medicine, Physics, and Arts.

The Wolf Prize in Chemistry is considered to be one of the most prestigious international chemistry awards, behind only the Nobel Prize in Chemistry. Becoming a Wolf Prize laureate has been viewed as a potential precursor to receiving the Nobel Prize. As of 2026, 14 awardees have subsequently become Nobel laureates; (Note: Subsequent Nobel laureates include John Charles Polanyi (1982), Elias James Corey (1990), Richard R. Ernst (1991), Rudolph A. Marcus (1992), John Pople (1998), Ahmed Zewail (1999), Ryoji Noyori and K. Barry Sharpless (both 2001); Gerhard Ertl (2007), Ada E. Yonath (2009), William E. Moerner (2014), Carolyn R. Bertozzi (2022), Omar M. Yaghi (2025), and Henri B. Kagan (2026).) the most recent of those is Henri B. Kagan.

== Laureates ==
Year	Name	Nationality	Citation
1978	Carl Djerassi	Austria	for his work in bioorganic chemistry, application of new spectroscopic techniques, and his support of international cooperation.
1979	Herman Mark	Austria	for his contributions to understanding the structure and behavior of natural and synthetic polymers.
1980	Henry Eyring	Mexico	for his development of absolute rate theory and its imaginative applications to chemical and physical processes.
1981	Joseph Chatt	United Kingdom	for pioneering and fundamental contributions to synthetic transition metal chemistry, particularly transition metal hydrides and dinitrogen complexes.
1982	John Charles Polanyi	Hungary / Canada	for his studies of chemical reactions in unprecedented detail by developing the infrared chemiluminescence technique, and for envisaging the chemical laser.
1982	George C. Pimentel	United States	for development of matrix isolation spectroscopy and for the discovery of photodissociation lasers and chemical lasers.
1983/4	Herbert S. Gutowsky	United States	for his pioneering work in the development and applications of nuclear magnetic resonance spectroscopy in chemistry.
1983/4	Harden M. McConnell	United States	for his studies of the electronic structure of molecules through paramagnetic resonance spectroscopy and for the introduction and biological applications of spin label techniques.
1983/4	John S. Waugh	United States	for his fundamental theoretical and experimental contributions to high resolution nuclear magnetic resonance spectroscopy in solids.
1984/5	Rudolph A. Marcus	Canada / United States	for his contributions to chemical kinetics, especially the theories of unimolecular reactions and electron transfer reactions.
1986	Elias James Corey	United States	for outstanding research on the synthesis of many highly complex natural products and the demonstration of novel ways of thinking about such syntheses.
1986	Albert Eschenmoser	Switzerland	for outstanding research on the synthesis, stereochemistry and reaction mechanisms for formation of natural products, especially Vitamin-B12.
1987	David C. Phillips; David M. Blow	United Kingdom; United Kingdom	for their contributions to protein X-ray crystallography and to the elucidation of structures of enzymes and their mechanisms of action.
1988	Joshua Jortner; Raphael David Levine	Israel; Israel	for their incisive theoretical studies elucidating energy acquisition and disposal in molecular systems and mechanisms for dynamical selectivity and specificity.
1989	Duilio Arigoni; Alan R. Battersby	Switzerland; United Kingdom	for their fundamental contributions to the elucidation of the mechanism of enzymic reactions and of the biosynthesis of natural products, in particular the pigments of life.
1990	No award		
1991	Richard R. Ernst	Switzerland	for his revolutionary contributions to NMR spectroscopy, especially Fourier-transform and two-dimensional NMR
1991	Alexander Pines	Israel / United States	for his revolutionary contributions to NMR spectroscopy, especially multiple-quantum and high-spin NMR.
1992	John Pople	United Kingdom	for his outstanding contributions to theoretical chemistry, particularly in developing effective and widely used modern quantum- chemical methods.
1993	Ahmed Hassan Zewail	Egypt / United States	for pioneering the development of laser femtochemistry. Using lasers and molecular beams, femtochemistry has made it now possible to probe the evolution of chemical reactions as they actually happen in real time.
1994/5	Richard Lerner; Peter Schultz	United States; United States	for developing catalytic antibodies, thus permitting the catalysis of chemical reactions considered impossible to achieve by classical chemical procedures.
1995/6	Gilbert Stork; Samuel J. Danishefsky	United States; United States	for designing and developing novel chemical reactions which have opened new avenues to the synthesis of complex molecules, particularly polysaccharides and many other biologically and medicinally important compounds.
1996/7	No award		
1998	Gerhard Ertl; Gabor A. Somorjai	Germany; Hungary United States	for their outstanding contributions to the field of the surface science in general, and for their elucidation of fundamental mechanisms of heterogeneous catalytic reactions at single crystal surfaces in particular.
1999	Raymond U. Lemieux	Canada	for his fundamental and seminal contributions to the study and synthesis of oligosaccharides and to the elucidation of their role in molecular recognition in biological systems.
2000	Frank Albert Cotton	United States	for opening up an entirely new phase of transition metal chemistry based on pairs and clusters of metal atoms directly linked by single or multiple bonds.
2001	Henri B. Kagan; Ryōji Noyori; K. Barry Sharpless	France; Japan; United States	for their pioneering, creative and crucial work in developing asymmetric catalysis for the synthesis of chiral molecules, greatly increasing mankind's ability to create new products of fundamental and practical importance.
2002/3	No award		
2004	Harry B. Gray	United States	for pioneering work in bio-inorganic chemistry, unravelling novel principles of structure and long-range electron transfer in proteins.
2005	Richard N. Zare	United States	for his ingenious applications of laser techniques, for identifying complex mechanisms in molecules, and their use in analytical chemistry.
2006/7	Ada Yonath; George Feher	Israel; United States Hungary	for ingenious structural discoveries of the ribosomal machinery of peptide-bond formation and the light-driven primary processes in photosynthesis.
2008	William E. Moerner; Allen J. Bard	United States; United States	for the ingenious creation of a new field of science, single molecule spectroscopy and electrochemistry, with impact at the nanoscopic regime, from the molecular and cellular domain to complex material systems.
2009	No award		
2010	No award		
2011	Stuart A. Rice; Ching W. Tang; Krzysztof Matyjaszewski	United States; United States; Poland / United States	for the deep creative contributions to the chemical sciences in the field of synthesis, properties and an understanding of organic materials.
2012	A. Paul Alivisatos	United States	for his development of the colloidal inorganic nanocrystal as a building block of nanoscience and for making fundamental contributions to controlling the synthesis of these particles, to measuring and understanding their physical properties.
2012	Charles M. Lieber	United States	for his seminal contributions to nanochemistry and particularly the synthesis of single-crystalline semiconductor nanowires, characterization of the fundamental physical properties of nanowires, and their application to electronics, photonics and nanomedicine.
2013	Robert S. Langer	United States	for conceiving and implementing advances in polymer chemistry that provide both controlled drug-release systems and new biomaterials.
2014	Chi-Huey Wong	Taiwan / United States	for his numerous and original contributions to the development of innovative methods for the programmable and applied synthesis of complex oligosaccharides and glycol-proteins.
2015	No award		
2016	Kyriacos Costa Nicolaou	Cyprus / United States	for advancing the field of chemical synthesis to the extremes of molecular complexity, linking structure and function and expanding our dominion over the interface of chemistry, biology and medicine.
2016	Stuart Schreiber	United States	for pioneering chemical insights into the logic of signal transduction and gene regulation that led to important, new therapeutics and for advancing chemical biology and medicine through the discovery of small-molecule probes.
2017	Robert G. Bergman	United States	for his discovery of the activation responses of carbon-hydrogen bonds in hydrocarbons by soluble organometallic complexes.
2018	Omar M. Yaghi	Jordan / United States	for pioneering reticular chemistry via metal-organic frameworks (MOFs) and covalent organic frameworks (COFs).
2018	Makoto Fujita	Japan	for conceiving metal-directed assembly principles leading to large highly porous complexes.
2019	Stephen L. Buchwald; John F. Hartwig	United States; United States	for pioneering the development of transition metal catalyzed procedures that are broadly applicable and allow carbon-heteroatom bonds of all sorts to be formed with previously unknown efficiency and precision.
2020	No award		
2021	Leslie Leiserowitz; Meir Lahav	Israel; Israel	for collaboratively established the fundamental reciprocal influences of three-dimensional molecular structure upon structures of organic crystals.
2022	Bonnie L. Bassler; Carolyn R. Bertozzi; Benjamin F. Cravatt	United States; United States; United States	for their seminal contributions to understanding the chemistry of cellular communication and inventing chemical methodologies to study the role of carbohydrates, lipids, and proteins in such biological processes.
2023	Chuan He; Hiroaki Suga; Jeffery W. Kelly	United States; Japan; United States	for pioneering discoveries that illuminate the functions and pathological dysfunctions of RNA and proteins and for creating strategies to harness the capabilities of these biopolymers in new ways to ameliorate human diseases.
2024	No award		
2025	Helmut F. Schwarz	Germany	for quantifying reactive species in the gas phase to solve fundamental problems in catalysis.
2026	David Klenerman; Pascal Mayer; Shankar Balasubramanian	United Kingdom; France; India / United States	for developing impactful, low-cost, large-scale DNA sequencing methods for genomic medicine.

== Laureates per country ==
Below is a chart of all laureates per country (updated to 2026 laureates). Some laureates are counted more than once if they have multiple citizenships.

Country	Number of laureates
United States	39
United Kingdom	6
Israel	5
Hungary	3
Canada	3
Switzerland	3
Japan	3
Austria	2
Germany	2
France	2
Mexico	1
Egypt	1
Poland	1
Taiwan	1
Jordan	1
Cyprus	1

== See also ==
- List of chemistry awards
