= Hiroaki Suga =

Japanese chemist (born 1963)

- Born: 菅 裕明; February 21, 1963 (age 63); Okayama, Japan
- Education: Okayama University (BSc, MSc); Massachusetts Institute of Technology (PhD)
- Known for: RNA-based catalysis
- Awards: Wolf Prize (2023)
- Scientific career
- Fields: Chemistry
- Institutions: Harvard Medical School; University at Buffalo; University of Tokyo
- Thesis: Catalytic antibodies elicited via homologous and heterologous immunization (1994)
- Doctoral advisor: Satoru Masamune

Hiroaki Suga (菅 裕明, born February 21, 1963) is a Japanese biochemist and businessman. He is best known for his work on artificial ribozymes (flexizymes) and their application in mRNA display (RaPID, random nonstandard peptide integrated discovery).

Suga was awarded the 2023 Wolf Prize in Chemistry, jointly with Chuan He and Jeffery W. Kelly, "for pioneering discoveries that illuminate the functions and pathological dysfunctions of RNA and proteins and for creating strategies to harness the capabilities of these biopolymers in new ways to ameliorate human diseases."

== Education ==
Suga graduated from Okayama University (BSc, MSc) in engineering, and studied at University of Lausanne, where he worked with Manfred Schlosser.

Suga completed his Ph.D. in chemistry at Massachusetts Institute of Technology in 1994 with Satoru Masamune, working on catalytic antibodies

== Career ==
=== Scientific ===
After graduating from MIT with a Ph.D., Suga was a postdoctoral researcher at the Jack W. Szostak lab of Harvard Medical School before starting his independent career at University at Buffalo. Since 2003 he is a faculty member at the University of Tokyo.

=== Business ===
Suga is also a founder of PeptiDream Inc. Tokyo, a publicly traded biopharmaceutical start-up company responsible for discovering and developing non-standard peptide therapeutics in addition to addressing unmet medical needs as well as investigating peptide drug conjugates (PDC), peptides, and small molecule-based drugs. It is traded publicly on the Tokyo First Stock Exchange Market (the market capitalization is over JY 600 billions), which has many partnerships with pharmaceutical companies in worldwide.

Suga is chair of the editorial board at RSC Chemical Biology and associate editor at Angewandte Chemie.

== Publications ==
Suga has published over 250 scientific articles; a small selection is presented here:

- Lee, Nick; Bessho, Yoshitaka; Wei, Kenneth; Szostak, Jack W.; Suga, Hiroaki (2000). "Ribozyme-catalyzed tRNA aminoacylation". Nature Structural Biology. 7 (1): 28–33. doi:10.1038/71225. PMID 10625423. S2CID 1831912.
- Ramaswamy, Krishna; Saito, Hirohide; Murakami, Hiroshi; Shiba, Kiyotaka; Suga, Hiroaki (2004). "Designer Ribozymes: Programming the tRNA Specificity into Flexizyme". Journal of the American Chemical Society. 126 (37): 11454–11455. Bibcode:2004JAChS.12611454R. doi:10.1021/ja046843y. PMID 15366888.
- Passioura, Toby; Suga, Hiroaki (2017). "A RaPID way to discover nonstandard macrocyclic peptide modulators of drug targets". Chemical Communications. 53 (12): 1931–1940. doi:10.1039/C6CC06951G. PMID 28091672.

== Awards ==
- 2014 – Akabori Memorial Award (Japanese Peptide Society)
- 2016 – Max Bergmann Gold Medal (German Peptide Society)
- 2016 – Nippon Venture Award (METI)
- 2017 – Nagoya Silver Medal of Organic Chemistry (MSD Life Science Foundation)
- 2019 – Vincent du Vigneaud Award (American Peptide Society)
- 2020 – Humboldt Prize (Humboldt Foundation)
- 2020 – World Entrepreneur of the Year, Japan (EY)
- 2022 – Prelog Medal (ETH Zurich)
- 2023 – Wolf Prize in Chemistry (Wolf Foundation)
- 2024 – Asian Scientist 100 (Asian Scientist)
- 2026 – Elected a Fellow of the Royal Society
