= Gérard Bricogne =

French biophysicist and crystallographer

- Born: 1949 (age 76–77)
- Education: University of Cambridge
- Scientific career
- Workplaces: Uppsala University; Columbia University

Gérard Marie Robert Bricogne (born October, 1949 in Aix-en-Provence, France) is a French biophysicist and crystallographer.

== Education and career ==
Bricogne studied mathematics and chemistry at University of Nancy and graduated in 1972. He received his doctorate from University of Cambridge under David Mervyn Blow in 1975 and was then a Research Fellow at Trinity College, Cambridge until 1981, working in the group of Aaron Klug. During the period, he also visited Stephen C. Harrison's laboratory at Harvard University. From 1981 to 1983 he was an assistant professor at Columbia University and from 1983 he was research director of the CNRS at the LURE in Orsay and in the biology department of the CNRS.

Bricogne researches mathematical methods in crystallography and was involved in a revolution in using new methods to determine the structures of very large macromolecules in biology from X-ray diffraction data. In 1978 he was the first to determine the structure of a virus (the tobacco mosaic virus and the tomato bushy stunt virus) at the atomic level (with Aaron Klug and others).

He is Research Director of CNRS and Director and Founder (1996) of Global Phasing Ltd, a nonprofit company based in Cambridge, UK.

From 1993 to 1998 he was a visiting scientist at the MRC Laboratory of Molecular Biology in Cambridge and in 1992 a visiting scientist at the Howard Hughes Medical Institute. In 1992/93 he was a visiting professor at Uppsala University. In 1999 he became a corresponding member of the Académie des sciences in the mathematics section. In 1988 he became a member of the European Molecular Biology Organization (EMBO), serving on its Scientific Council from 1985 to 1990.

== Honors and awards ==
In 2005, he received an honorary doctorate from Uppsala University and in 2008, he received the Gregori Aminoff Prize from the Swedish Academy of Sciences. In 1994 he received the Dorothy Hodgkin Prize, in 1985 the Prix Grammaticakis-Neumann of the Académie des Sciences and in 1999 the Patterson Award of the American Crystallographic Association.

== Bibliography ==
- Maximum entropy and the foundations of direct methods, Acta Crystallographica, A 40, 1984, S. 410–445
- Fourier transforms in crystallography: theory, algorithms and applications, in: International tables for crystallography, Vol. B, 1993. S. 23–106
- The Bayesian statistical viewpoint on structure determination: basic concepts and examples, Meth. Enzymol., Vol. 276, 1997, S. 361–423
