= Michael Rossmann =

German-American physicist and microbiologist (1930–2019)

- Born: 30 July 1930; Frankfurt, Germany
- Died: 14 May 2019 (aged 88); West Lafayette, Indiana, U.S.
- Education: University of London; University of Glasgow
- Known for: common cold virus structure Rossmann fold molecular replacement X-ray crystallography
- Awards: Louisa Gross Horwitz Prize; Gregori Aminoff Prize; Ewald Prize; Paul Ehrlich and Ludwig Darmstaedter Prize; Sackler International Prize in Biophysics
- Scientific career
- Fields: Biophysics
- Workplaces: Purdue University; MRC Laboratory of Molecular Biology
- Thesis: "A Study of Some Organic Crystal Structures"
- Academic advisors: J. Monteath Robertson; William N. Lipscomb, Jr. Max Perutz
- Doctoral students: Ping Zhang

Michael G. Rossmann (30 July 1930 – 14 May 2019) was a German-American physicist, microbiologist, and Hanley Distinguished Professor of Biological Sciences at Purdue University who led a team of researchers to be the first to map the structure of a human common cold virus to an atomic level. He also discovered the Rossmann fold protein motif. His most well recognised contribution to structural biology is the development of a phasing technique named molecular replacement, which has led to about three quarters of depositions in the Protein Data Bank.

== Education ==
Born in Frankfurt, Germany, Rossmann studied physics and mathematics at the University of London, where he received BSc and MSc degrees. He moved to Glasgow in 1953 where he taught physics in the technical college and received his Ph.D. in chemical crystallography in 1956. He attributes his initial interest in crystallography to Kathleen Lonsdale, whom he heard speak as a schoolboy.

Rossmann began his career as a crystallographer when he became a student of J. Monteath Robertson at the University of Glasgow. The title of his thesis was "A Study of Some Organic Crystal Structures".

In 1956 he and his family moved to the University of Minnesota, where he worked for two years as a post-doctoral fellow with Professor William N. Lipscomb Jr., publishing on the structure of an Iresin Diester and a terpenoid, and writing computer programs for analysing structures.

== Career ==
Rossmann returned to the UK and to the University of Cambridge in 1958, where he worked with Max Perutz on the structure of hemoglobin as a research associate at the MRC Laboratory of Molecular Biology.

In 1964 Rossmann joined the faculty of the Department of Biological Sciences at Purdue University as an associate professor. He directed the Purdue X-ray crystallography laboratory. He became full professor in 1967 and from 1978 held the chair of Hanley Distinguished Professor of Biological Sciences at the university. He also held a joint appointment in the department of biochemistry and adjunct positions in Cornell University's Division of Biological Sciences and in Indiana University's school of medicine.

In 1970 his laboratory found the structure of dogfish lactate dehydrogenase, one of the largest early proteins to be solved. In 1973 his group found the structure of Glyceraldehyde 3-phosphate dehydrogenase, and Rossmann immediately realized that the binding site for the NAD^{+} was very similar to the one in the lactate dehydrogenase. This is now called the Rossmann fold. It is found in enzymes (such as dehydrogenases or kinases) that bind molecules such as ATP or NAD^{+}/NADH.

Rossmann then turned to viruses, spending a sabbatical in 1971 with Bror Strandberg in Uppsala, Sweden, working on the structure of the satellite tobacco necrosis virus. From 1972 to 1980 Rossmann and his team worked on the southern bean mosaic virus. This required developing new software and adapting existing software for Fourier transforms. It was found that this virus had a similar "jelly roll fold" to that found previously in the tomato bushy stunt virus, which at the time was a surprise.

In the early 1980s Rossmann began working on picornaviruses, and chose HRV14, one of the viruses that cause the common cold. Part of the problem was that it was very difficult at the time to produce milligram quantities of an animal virus, as needed for the X-ray crystallography. Rossmann pushed for the purchase by Purdue of a Cyber 205 supercomputer, capable of delivering hundreds of megaflops. After vectorizing the computer programs, calculations that had taken six weeks with the southern bean mosaic virus now took, for HRV14, only a fraction of a day. In 1985, he published his team's mapping in the journal Nature. The breakthrough nature of this result was such that the National Science Foundation, which provided partial funding for the research, saw fit to organize a press conference, and the news travelled in the general press. This work laid the foundation for a molecular understanding of cell entry of enteroviruses and for the development of capsid-binding inhibitors against a broad range of enteroviruses.

After the success with the first cold virus, work was done on alphaviruses and flaviviruses. Using cryo-electron microscopy, in 2016 his lab reported the first known structure of the Zika virus, responsible for a severe epidemic at the time. This work was made possible by more than one decade of studies on related mosquito borne flaviviruses, including dengue virus, using a combination of cryo-electron microscopy and X-ray crystallography.

Rossmann also had a long-term interest in complicated viral machines. These are exemplified by bacteriophage T4 and nucleocytoplasmic large DNA viruses, also referred to as giant viruses. The determination of an atomic structure of Paramecium bursaria chlorella virus 1 that infects algae has opened up new possibilities for studying giant viruses at the atomic level.

== Life and hobbies ==
Rossmann was an avid hiker and sailboat enthusiast, winning M-16 Scow races on Indiana lakes. He was very energetic, which sometimes caused difficulties for his team members.

Rossmann's wife, Audrey, was a potter and artist. They had three children, Martin, Alice, and Heather. Audrey died in 2009.

When diagnosed with cancer, Rossmann moved into a retirement home, where he met and later married a staff member in charge of welcoming and hospitality, Karen Bogan. He was working on papers and grant proposals until shortly before his death.

Rossmann died on 14 May 2019. Purdue president (and former Indiana governor) Mitch Daniels said of him, "Still vital, still curious, still in his lab at age 88, his was a life as rich in personal example as it was in scientific achievement."

== Rossmann supercomputer ==
The Rossmann cluster is named for Michael Rossmann, Purdue's Hanley Distinguished Professor of Biological Sciences, who is a pioneer in employing high-performance computing in research to reveal the structure of viruses and their component protein molecules. Calculating electron density structure from X-ray crystallography results by Rossmann's team had long been one of the larger tasks carried out on Purdue's computing systems.

== Awards and honors ==
Among other honors, Michael Rossmann was elected Fellow of the American Academy of Arts and Sciences in 1978, Member of the National Academy of Sciences in 1984, Foreign Member of the Royal Society of London in 1996, and Fellow of the American Association for the Advancement of Science in 1999.

In 1990, he was awarded Louisa Gross Horwitz Prize from Columbia University. He was awarded honorary doctorates by Uppsala University, Sweden (1983); the University of Strasbourg, France; Vrije Universiteit Brussel, Belgium; University of Glasgow, Scotland; University of York, England; Institut Armand-Frappier, University of Québec, Canada. He was awarded the Gregori Aminoff Prize in 1994, the Ewald Prize in 1996, and the Paul Ehrlich and Ludwig Darmstaedter Prize in 2001.

His own employer awarded him with the Purdue University Medal of Honor in 1995.

In 2016, he was awarded the Raymond and Beverly Sackler International Prize in Biophysics for pioneering contributions to high-resolution diffraction analysis of atomic structures of proteins and viruses.
