= Christopher G. Tate =

English biochemist and molecular biologist

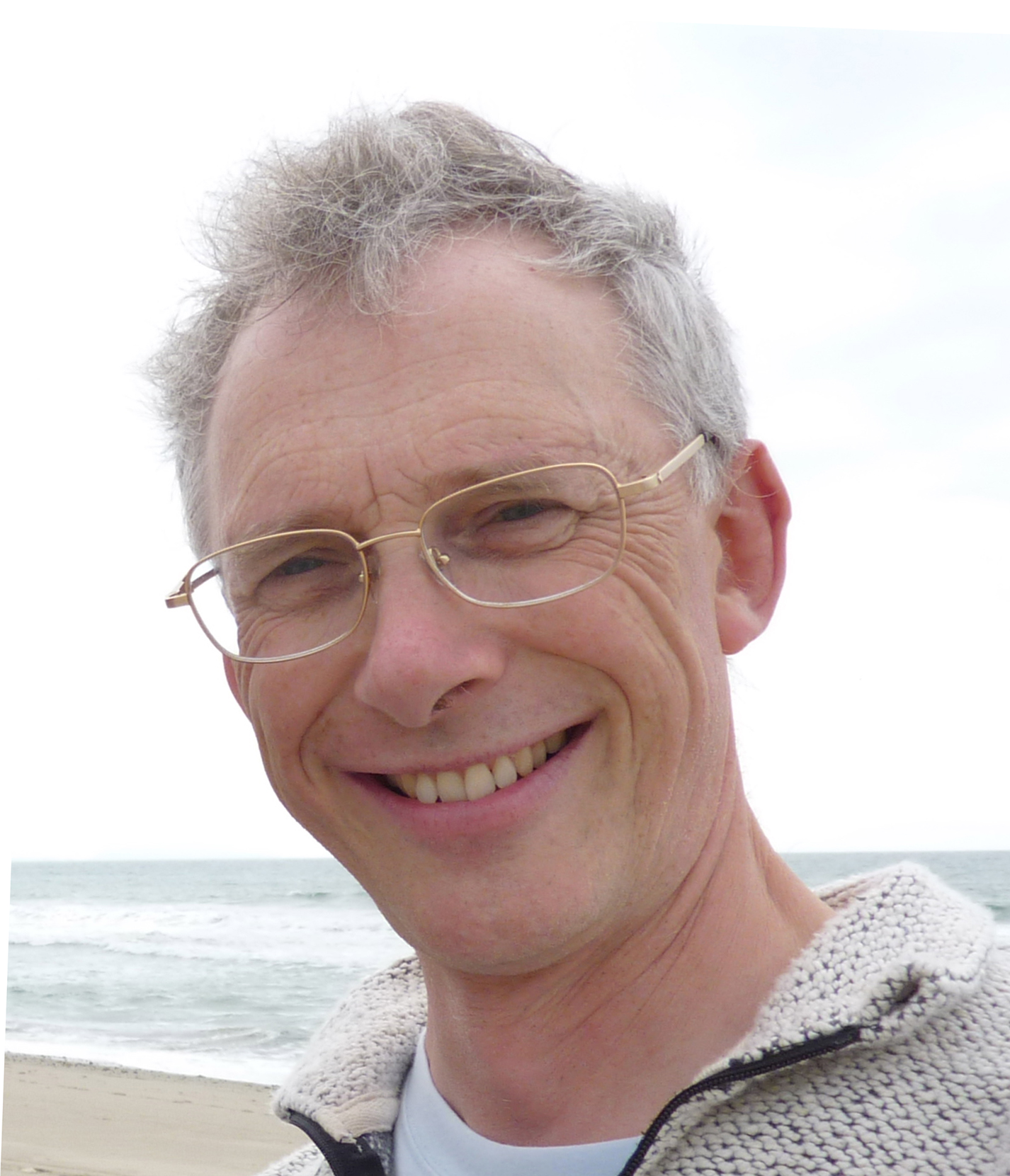
- Born: 5 May 1964 (age 62)
- Education: University of Bristol (BSc (Hons), PhD)
- Scientific career
- Fields: membrane protein biochemist and molecular biologist
- Workplaces: Laboratory of Molecular Biology (LMB)
- Doctoral advisor: Michael J. A. Tanner
- Website: https://mrclmb.ac.uk/research-leaders/chris-tate/

Christopher G. Tate FRS (born 5 May 1964) is an English membrane protein biochemist and molecular biologist who works at the Medical Research Council Laboratory of Molecular Biology in Cambridge, UK. Tate is known for his contributions to the understanding of G protein-coupled receptors.

== Education ==
Tate was awarded the degree of BSc (Hons) in biochemistry by the University of Bristol in 1985. He was then awarded a PhD in 1989 by the University of Bristol for his work on integral membrane proteins in the red blood cell, under the supervision of Michael J. A. Tanner.

== Career and research ==
Tate worked as a postdoctoral researcher (1989–1992) at the Department of Biochemistry, Cambridge, on bacterial sugar transporters in the group of Peter J. F. Henderson. After obtaining a research fellowship at Girton College, Cambridge, he then moved in 1992 to the Medical Research Council Laboratory of Molecular Biology to work with Richard Henderson, initially on the serotonin transporter and then on the structure determination of the multidrug EmrE transporter by electron crystallography. Whilst working in Henderson's group, Tate developed the method of conformational thermostabilisation of G protein-coupled receptors. This allowed the structure determination of the beta1-adrenoceptor in collaboration with the group of Gebhard F.X. Schertler. The methodology was patented and used as the basis for the foundation of the drug discovery company Heptares Therapeutics Ltd (HTL) in July 2007 by Tate, Henderson, Fiona Marshall (CSO) and Malcolm Weir (CEO).

Tate became an independent group leader in 2010 and since then his group has used structural biology to discover how the beta1-adrenoceptor and the adenosine A2A receptor are activated. In collaboration with the group of Reinhard Grisshammer (NIH, Bethesda), the structure of the thermostabilised neurotensin receptor was determined bound to a peptide agonist. Recent work has focused on understanding how G proteins coupled to G protein-coupled receptors, which has been facilitated by the development of mini-G proteins.

In 2021, Tate was elected a Fellow of the Royal Society.
