= Alwyn Jones (biophysicist) =

British biophysicist and professor (born 1947)

- Born: Thomas Alywn Jones; 30 August 1947 (age 79); Wales
- Education: King's College London
- Known for: Methods development for X-ray crystallography, such as interpretation of electron density maps
- Awards: FRS; Patterson Award of the American Crystallographic Association
- Scientific career
- Fields: Structure validation, biophysics
- Workplaces: Uppsala University
- Thesis: (BSc 1969; PhD 1973)
- Website: xray.bmc.uu.se/alwyn

Thomas Alwyn Jones (born 30 August 1947) is a Welsh biophysicist and a professor at the Uppsala University in Sweden.

== Early life and education ==
Alwyn Jones attended the primary school at Bedlinog, and went on to the Lewis School, Pengam where he studied his GCE Ordinary Levels and A-levels. He was educated at King's College London, where he received his BSc in physics and a PhD degree in biochemistry.

== Career ==
He held various positions at the Max Planck Institute for Biochemistry, Munich from 1973 to 1979, and in Uppsala from 1979. Jones was a research professor employed by the Swedish Natural Science Research Council 1987–1994, and has been Professor of Structural Biology at the Department of Molecular Biology, Uppsala, from 1994. He is also a Fellow of the Royal Society (elected in 1992) and a Foreign member of the Royal Swedish Academy of Sciences (elected in 2000). He is a recipient of the Gregori Aminoff Prize (2003), "for his pioneering development of methods to interpret electron density maps and to build models of biological macromolecules with the aid of computer graphics" and the Lindo Patterson Award, 2005, from the American Crystallographic Association.

Jones is most noted for development of widely used programs for fitting models into crystallographic electron density maps, first Frodo, then its further developed version O (molecular graphics), and for involvement in structure validation. He has solved a very large number of protein crystal structures and is listed as a depositor on 126 structures at the Protein Data Bank, especially emphasizing enzymes and viruses. Web of Science credits him with over 29,000 citations, and Google Scholar with over 14,000 citations (since 1990) and an h-index of 58, including over 11,000 citations for O and 1700 for Frodo. He is currently a professor at Uppsala University in Sweden.
