= Ping Zhang (biologist) =

American structural biologist

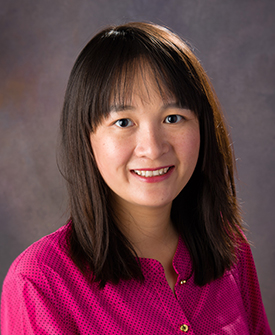
- Zhang in 2016
- Education: Purdue University
- Scientific career
- Fields: Structural biology, cancer biology
- Workplaces: University of California, San Diego; National Cancer Institute
- Doctoral advisor: Michael Rossmann

Ping Zhang is an American structural biologist researching the structural and mechanistic basis of multi-component kinase signaling complexes that are linked to human cancers and other diseases, with a long-term goal of developing new therapeutic strategies. She is a NIH Stadtman Investigator in the Structural Biophysics Laboratory at the National Cancer Institute.

== Education ==
Zhang completed a Ph.D. in Michael Rossmann’s lab at Purdue University in the field of biochemistry and structural virology. Her Ph.D. project was resolving the structures of poliovirus-receptor complexes using X-ray crystallography and cryogenic electron microscopy (cryo-EM). She completed her postdoctoral training at Howard Hughes Medical Institute and in Susan S. Taylor’s laboratory at University of California, San Diego, working on a signal transduction system related to human diseases and learning other techniques in structural biology and cell signaling that are suited for studying dynamic signaling complexes.

== Career and research ==
Ping was an assistant project scientist in the department of pharmacology at the University of California, San Diego. She joined the Structural Biophysics Laboratory at National Cancer Institute (NCI) as a NIH Stadtman Tenure Track Investigator in August 2016. She researches the structural and mechanistic basis of multi-component kinase signaling complexes that are linked to human cancers and other diseases, with a long-term goal of developing new therapeutic strategies. Current research topics include the Raf family kinases, and the leucine-rich repeat kinases and an oncogenic PKA kinase fusion protein. Zhang's lab applies integrated structural biology (single-particle cryo-electron microscopy and X-ray crystallography) and biochemical approaches to achieve our objective of studying these kinase complexes in their functional states. This strategy is used to reveal the mechanistic details and factors critical for driving the functional activities of these kinases and how these activities may be altered in pathological states.
