= Cholesterol oxidase =

Class of enzymes

cholesterol oxidase

Identifiers
- EC no.: 1.1.3.6
- CAS no.: 9028-76-6

Databases
- BRENDA: enzyme data
- ExPASy: NiceZyme view
- KEGG: enzyme entry
- MetaCyc: metabolic pathway
- Rhea: reactions
- PDB structures: RCSB PDB PDBe PDBsum
- Gene Ontology: AmiGO / QuickGO
Search
- PMC: articles
- PubMed: articles
- NCBI: proteins

Cholesterol oxidase substrate-binding domain
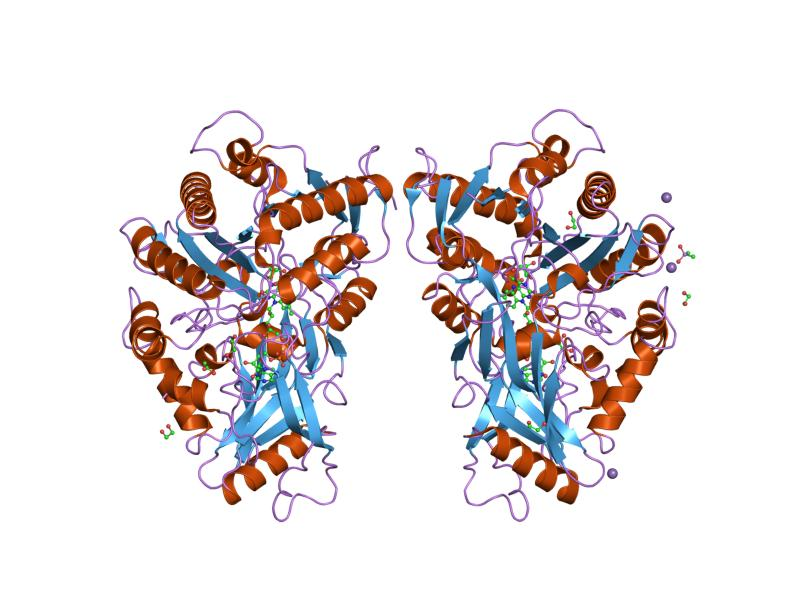
- crystal structure of cholesterol oxidase from b.sterolicum

Identifiers
- Symbol: Chol_subst-bind
- Pfam: PF09129
- Pfam clan: CL0277
- InterPro: IPR015213
- SCOP2: 1i19 / SCOPe / SUPFAM
Available protein structures:
- PDB: IPR015213 PF09129 (ECOD; PDBsum)
- AlphaFold: IPR015213; PF09129

In enzymology, cholesterol oxidase (EC 1.1.3.6) is an enzyme that catalyzes the chemical reaction

cholesterol
O_{2}
H_{2}O_{2}
O_{2}
H_{2}O_{2}
cholesterone

The two substrates of this enzyme are cholesterol and oxygen. Its products are cholest-4-en-3-one (cholesterone) and hydrogen peroxide.

This enzyme belongs to the family of oxidoreductases, specifically those acting on the CH-OH group of donor with oxygen as acceptor. The systematic name of this enzyme class is cholesterol:oxygen oxidoreductase. Other names in common use include cholesterol- O2 oxidoreductase, 3beta-hydroxy steroid oxidoreductase, and 3beta-hydroxysteroid:oxygen oxidoreductase. This enzyme participates in bile acid biosynthesis.

The substrate-binding domain found in some bacterial cholesterol oxidases is composed of an eight-stranded mixed beta-pleated sheet and six alpha-helices. This domain is positioned over the isoalloxazine ring system of the FAD cofactor bound by the FAD-binding domain and forms the roof of the active site cavity, allowing for catalysis of oxidation and isomerisation of cholesterol to cholest-4-en-3-one.

== Structural studies ==
As of late 2007, 14 structures have been solved for this class of enzymes, with PDB accession codes PDB: 1B4V, PDB: 1B8S, PDB: 1CBO, PDB: 1CC2, PDB: 1COY, PDB: 1I19, PDB: 1IJH, PDB: 1MXT, PDB: 1N1P, PDB: 1N4U, PDB: 1N4V, PDB: 1N4W, PDB: 2GEW, and PDB: 3COX.
