= Meir Lahav =

Israeli chemist and materials scientist

- מאיר להב
- Born: 1936 (age 89–90); Sofia, Bulgaria
- Occupations: Chemist, materials scientist
- Known for: Research on crystal formation, chirality, and self-assembling monolayers
- Awards: Centenary Prize (1984/85); Prelog Medal (1987); Gregori Aminoff Prize (2002); Chirality Medal (2006); Israel Prize (2016); EMET Prize (2018); Wolf Prize in Chemistry (2021)

Meir Lahav (Hebrew: מאיר להב; born 1936 in Sofia, Bulgaria) is an Israeli chemist and materials scientist. He is an emeritus professor at the Weizmann Institute of Science.

== Biography ==
Lahav emigrated to Israel in 1948. He studied at the Hebrew University of Jerusalem, where he obtained a master's degree in polymer chemistry in 1962. With Gerhard Schmidt at the Weizmann Institute of Science, he obtained a Ph.D. in solid state chemistry. As a postdoctoral fellow, Lahav worked with Paul Doughty Bartlett at Harvard University, among others, before returning to Israel in 1971. Since 1985 he has held a full professorship at the Weizmann Institute.

In a long-term collaboration with Leslie Leiserowitz, Lahav dealt with how crystal formation and growth can be influenced by targeted impurities (useful impurities) and with the direct determination of the sense of chirality of molecules. He investigated crystallization and interface phenomena such as the packing of amphiphilic molecules at the phase boundary and the basis for heterogeneous catalysis. He sought to understand biomembranes and designed self-assembling Langmuir-Blodgett layers (see self-assembling monolayer), investigated reaction pathways through asymmetric transformations into chiral and centrosymmetric crystals, guest-host interactions in organic solids, the correlation of macroscopic phenomena with molecular chirality, as well as stereochemical and regiospecific photoreactions within organic solids.

Lahav received the Centenary Prize of the Royal Society of Chemistry in 1984/85, the Prelog Medal in 1987, the Gregori Aminoff Prize in 2002, the Chirality Medal in 2006, and the Israel Prize in 2016. For 2018 he was awarded the EMET Prize. In 2021 he and Leslie Leiserowitz jointly received the Wolf Prize in Chemistry. He has been a member of the Leopoldina since 1997.

Meir Lahav is married and has three children.
