= Natalia Dubrovinskaia =

Swedish geologist

- Born: 18 February 1961 (age 65)

Academic background
- Education: Moscow State University (MSc, PhD)

Academic work
- Discipline: Geology
- Sub-discipline: Crystallography
- Institutions: University of Bayreuth; Heidelberg University

Natalia Dubrovinskaia (born 18 February 1961) is a Swedish geologist of Russian origin.

== Education ==
In 1983, Dubrovinskaia earned a Master of Science degree in geochemistry from Moscow State University. In 1989, she received her Ph.D. in crystallography and crystal physics at the same institution. She worked as a senior researcher fellow until 2007, completing her habilitation of crystallography and Umhabilitation the following year at University of Bayreuth, Germany. In 2011, she worked as a staff scientist at the University of Heidelberg.

== Career ==
Dubrovinskaia was a research fellow at the Ministry of Geology and a postdoctoral researcher at Uppsala University.

In 2005, she led a team of researchers from the University of Bayreuth that was reported to have produced aggregated diamond nanorods from fullerene under high temperatures and pressures. Two years earlier, Japanese researchers had produced large samples of nanodiamond from graphite in a more cost-effective way and discovered to be harder than diamond.

From 2007 to 2011, Dubrovinskaia worked at the Heidelberg University in Germany as a Privatdozent and senior scientist. Since then, she returned to University of Bayreuth, where she is employed as Professor of Materials Physics and Technology at Extreme Conditions.

From 2012 to 2014, Dubrovinskaia was the Editor-in-Chief of the International Journal of Materials and Chemistry.

== Personal life ==
Dubrovinskaia is married to Leonid Dubrovinsky, a geoscientist at University of Bayreuth. Together, both she and her husband have been working as a scientific team for the past four decades.

== Research ==
Throughout her career, Dubrovinskaia has published over 246 papers covering a variety of topics but mostly focusing on crystallography, diamond anvil cells, analytical chemistry, diffraction and diamond. Her extensive research in the field of biology encompasses various subjects such as X-ray crystallography, bulk modulus, and boron. Additionally, her investigation using diamond anvil cells focus on areas such as mineralogy—specifically related to mantle and stishovite—as well as thermodynamics, which has connections to fields like Earth's core studies.

Her works in analytical chemistry encompasses ab initio quantum chemistry methods and ambient pressure, while her diffraction study integrates various areas, including elasticity, phase transitions, single crystals, synchrotron, and isostructural phenomena. Her investigation delves into the correlation between diamond and topics such as chemical engineering, intersecting with challenges in metal-related issues. Furthermore, she has also done research into a new method of synthesizing rare earth-metal compounds. In this research, her primary was on exploring the intriguing reactivity of alkali halides, like common table salt (NaCl), when subjected to high pressure in the presence of rare-earth metals such as yttrium and dysprosium.

== Publications ==
Natalia Dubrovinskaia has been an author or affiliate of these publications.

Year	Date	Publication title and description
2001	May 21	Pressure-Induced Invar Effect in Fe-Ni Alloys. The pressure-volume relations were measured for three different Iron-nickel alloys. It was observed in ambient pressure, that Fe-Ni alloys with high Ni concentrations had positive thermal expansion.
2001	December 7	Experimental and Theoretical Identification of a New High-Pressure TiO2 Polymorph. They discovered a new polymorph of titanium dioxide.
2004	May 17	Titanium metal at high pressure: Synchrotron experiments and ab initio calculations. They are investigating the behaviour of titanium metal under high pressure.
2004	September 2	Cubic TiO2 as a potential light absorber in solar-energy conversion. The electronic structural properties of cubic TiO2 polymorphs were investigated using the first-principles method.
2004	December 1	High-pressure and high-temperature synthesis of the cubic TiO2 polymorph. This experiment suggested that when IV 𝐴⁢𝐵 and IV 𝐴 element dioxides follow the same transformation path under high temperature and elevated pressure.
2005	March 24	Structural characterization of the hard fullerite phase obtained at 13GPa and 830K.
2005	December 8	Beating the Miscibility Barrier between Iron Group Elements and Magnesium by High-Pressure Alloying.
2007	January 25	Noblest of All Metals Is Structurally Unstable at High Pressure. It is shown that gold adopts a hexagonal–close-packed structure, under pressure above 240 GPa.
2007	October 19	Pure Iron Compressed and Heated to Extreme Conditions. It is indicated that in the pressure-temperature region above 160 GPa and 3700 K, the fcc phase of iron can exist.
2009	May 7	Superhard Semiconducting Optically Transparent High-Pressure Phase of Boron. At high temperatures and pressures above 9 GPa to 30 GPa an orthorhombic (space group 𝑃⁢𝑛⁢𝑛⁢𝑚) boron phase was shown to be stable.
2010	November 18	Pressure-induced isostructural phase transformation in γ-B28.
2011	April 21	Impact of lattice vibrations on the equation of state of the hardest boron phase.
2011	May 25	Electron-Deficient and Polycenter Bonds in the High-Pressure γ−B28 Phase of Boron.
2011	October 17	Missing-atom structure of diamond Σ5 (001) twist grain boundary. This experiment was about achieving the conditions in which grain boundaries are equilibrated.
2013	July 29	Experimental evidence of orbital order in α-B12 and γ-B28 polymorphs of elemental boron.
2013	October 7	Discovery of a Superhard Iron Tetraboride Superconductor.
2013	November 19	High-pressure behaviour of structural, optical, and electronic transport properties of the golden Th2S3-type Ti2O3.
2014	January 15	Role of Disorder in the Thermodynamics and Atomic Dynamics of Glasses.
2014	February 24	Peierls distortion, magnetism, and high hardness of manganese tetraboride. In high-pressure and high temperatures, crystal structure, electronic structure, and magnetism of manganese tetraboride, MnB4 were synthesized.
2016	May 26	Pressure-induced crossing of the core levels in 5d metals.
2017	May 16	Nonicosahedral boron allotrope synthesized at high pressure and high temperature.
2018	June 8	Breakdown of Magnetic Order in the Pressurized Kitaev Iridate β−Li2IrO3.
2019	July 17	Pressure-Induced Hydrogen-Hydrogen Interaction in Metallic FeH Revealed by NMR.
2019	September 23	Improving resolution of solid state NMR in dense molecular hydrogen.
2020	N/A	Materials synthesis and crystallography at extreme pressure-temperature conditions revealing remarkable material properties.
2020	May 28	High-Pressure Polymeric Nitrogen Allotrope with the Black Phosphorus Structure.
2020	October 8	Proton mobility in metallic copper hydride from high-pressure nuclear magnetic resonance.
2020	October 15	Novel sulfur hydrides synthesized at extreme conditions.
2021	March 12	Revealing the Complex Nature of Bonding in the Binary High-Pressure Compound FeO2.
2021	April 26	High-Pressure Synthesis of Dirac Materials: Layered van der Waals Bonded BeN4 Polymorph.
2021	September 22	Novel High-Pressure Yttrium Carbide γ−Y4C5 Containing [C2] and Nonlinear [C3] Units with Unusually Large Formal Charges.
2022	February 14	High-pressure Na3(N2)4, Ca3(N2)4, Sr3(N2)4, and Ba(N2)3 featuring nitrogen dimers with noninteger charges and anion-driven metallicity.
2022	October 1	Domain Auto Finder (DAFi) program: the analysis of single-crystal X-ray diffraction data from polycrystalline samples.
2022	November 18	Tin weathering experiment set by nature for 300 years: natural crystals of the anthropogenic mineral hydroromarchite from Creussen, Bavaria, Germany.
2023	January 9	High-pressure hP3 yttrium allotrope with CaHg2-type structure as a prototype of the hP3 rare-earth hydride series.

== Awards and positions ==
Year	Award Title and Information
1989	Natalia Dubrovinskaia received an Innovation Award from the USSR's Ministry of Geology for her contribution to geological advancements. The USSR (Union of Soviet Socialist Republics) was responsible for managing geological research, exploration, and development of mineral resources across the Soviet Union.
2005	Dubrovinskaia was honoured with a second Innovation Award from the USSR's Ministry of Geology for her ongoing contributions to geological sciences.
2006	Dubrovinskaia contributed as guest editor for a special issue of the High Pressure Research International Journal.
Since 2006	Dubrovinskaia has contributed as a reviewer for prestigious organizations such as the Swedish Research Council (VR), the German Research Foundation (DFG), the Danish Council for Independent Research (DCIR), the European Science Foundation (ESF), the National Science Foundation (NSF), the Research Council of Lithuania, the Danish Council for Independent Research (DCIR), the State National Science Award Commission (SNSAC of PRC), and the French National Research Agency (ANR).
Since 2006	Dubrovinskaia was a member of the American Physical Society (APS), German Physical Society (DPG), German Crystallographic Society (DGK), and the European Crystallographic Association (ECA).
2011	Dubrovinskaia contributed as guest editor for a special issue of the International Journal Materials.
2012-14	Dubrovinskaia held the position of chief editor of the International Journal of Materials and Chemistry, overseeing significant projects in the geological field.
2013-16	Dubrovinskaia was a peer review panel member for the Diamond Light Source in the UK, where she evaluated proposals and recommended how to distribute the beam time allocation.
2014	Dubrovinskaia was a speaker for the Organizing Committee for the International Year of Crystallography at the public research University of Bayreuth, Germany.
2014	Dubrovinskaia participated in the 52nd European High-Pressure Research Group International Meeting as a member of the International Advisory Committee.
2016	Dubrovinskaia was responsible for organizing and chairing the 54th EHPRG International Meeting of High-Pressure Science and Technology, held in Bayreuth, Germany.
2016	Dubrovinskaia served as guest editor for the special issue titled "Advances in High-Pressure Science and Technology" of the high-Pressure Research International Journal's.
2016-18	Dubrovinskaia was a member of the Beam Time Allocation Panel C05 at the European Synchrotron Radiation Facilities.
Since 2016	Dubrovinskaia was a member of the Scientific Reports Editorial Board at Nature Publishing Group, specializing in Chemical Physics.
2017	Dubrovinskaia was a member of the evaluation panel for the Swedish Research Council's 2017 call in the Natural and Engineering Sciences in Sweden.
2017	The Sweden Gregori Aminoff Prize was awarded to Dubrovinskaia from the University of Bayreuth Institute. She received this award for developing a new method to directly study crystal structures under extreme heat and pressure.
2018	Dubrovinskaia participated in the Assessment Review Board for the Leibniz Institute for Crystal Growth (IKZ) in Berlin, Germany.
2018	Dubrovinskaia was Invited to serve as the Convener for the Subtheme "Unconventional Syntheses of Inorganic Solids" at the 7th EuCheMS Chemistry Congress, hosted by the Royal Society of Chemistry (RSC) in Liverpool, UK. While serving as the Converner for the Subtheme she led discussions on innovative methods for synthesizing inorganic solid materials.
2019	Dubrovinskaia served as a research fellow and visiting professor at the Laboratory of Geosciences Environment, Observatoire Midi-Pyrénées in Toulouse, France.
2019	Dubrovinskaia was selected to be a member of the International Union of Crystallography's (IUCr) Ewald Prize 2020 Selection Committee. The Ewald Prize is awarded to individuals who significantly contribute to the field of crystallography, consisting of a metal, certificate, and a financial award. The selection of Dubrovinskaia for the IUCr expresses her expertises in crystallography.
