= George M. Sheldrick =

British chemist (1942–2025)

George M. Sheldrick FRS
- Born: George Michael Sheldrick; 17 November 1942; Huddersfield, England
- Died: 20 February 2025 (aged 82); Bovenden, Lower Saxony, Germany
- Citizenship: United Kingdom and Germany
- Education: Huddersfield New College
- Alma mater: Jesus College, Cambridge; University of Cambridge
- Known for: SHELX programs
- Spouse: Katherine Elizabeth Herford (m. 1968)
- Children: Four
- Scientific career
- Fields: Chemistry
- Workplaces: University of Göttingen
- Thesis: N.M.R. Studies of Inorganic Hydrides (1966)
- Doctoral advisor: Evelyn Ebsworth

George Michael Sheldrick, FRS (17 November 1942 – 20 February 2025) was a British chemist who specialised in molecular structure determination. He was one of the most cited workers in the field, having over 280,000 citations as of 2020 and an h-index of 113. He was a professor at the University of Göttingen from 1978 until his retirement in 2011.

== Early life ==
Sheldrick was born on 17 November 1942 in Huddersfield, England. He was educated at Huddersfield New College, then an all-boys grammar school. He completed nine O-Levels, six A-Levels, and two S-Levels. At A-Level, he achieved a distinction (the highest grade) in chemistry, mathematics and physics.

Sheldrick was awarded a Major Scholarship to study Natural Sciences at Jesus College, Cambridge. He specialised in chemistry in his final year. He graduated in 1963 with a first class Bachelor of Arts (BA) degree. He remained at the University of Cambridge to undertake postgraduate research under the supervision of Evelyn Ebsworth. He completed his Doctor of Philosophy (PhD) degree in 1966. The topic of his thesis was the investigation of inorganic hydrides using nuclear magnetic resonance spectroscopy, and was titled "N.M.R. Studies of Inorganic Hydrides".

== Academic career ==
In 1966, Sheldrick was elected a Fellow of Jesus College, Cambridge. During his time as an academic at the University of Cambridge, he also taught within the Faculty of Chemistry. He was a demonstrator from 1966 to 1971, and a lecturer from 1971 to 1978.

Sheldrick joined the University of Göttingen in 1978. There, he was first Professor of Inorganic Chemistry, then later Professor of Structural Chemistry. In 2011, he retired from full-time academia and was appointed Niedersachsen Professor (IE Emeritus Professor).

== Work ==
Sheldrick dealt with molecular structure elucidation by X-ray diffraction. He was the lead developer of the SHELX program suite, which is freely available online. In 2011, a graphical user interface for SHELX refinements called ShelXle was released.

== Personal life and death ==
On 13 July 1968, Sheldrick married Katherine Elizabeth Herford. Together they had four children. He died on 20 February 2025, at the age of 82.

His younger brother, William S. Sheldrick (1945–2015), was a professor of analytical chemistry at Ruhr University in Bochum, Germany until his retirement in 2010.

== Honours ==
- 1970 Meldola Medal of the Royal Society of Chemistry
- 1978 Corday-Morgan Prize of the Royal Society of Chemistry
- 1988 Gottfried Wilhelm Leibniz Prize of the Deutsche Forschungsgemeinschaft
- 1999 Carl-Hermann Medal of the German Society for Crystallography
- 2001 Fellow of the Royal Society
- 2004 Max Perutz Prize of the European Crystallographic Association
- 2009 Gregori Aminoff Prize of the Royal Swedish Academy of Sciences
- 2011 Ewald Prize of the International Union of Crystallography
- 2024 George M. Sheldrick Prize The European Crystallographic Association awarded its first award in honour of George Sheldrick.
