= Nigel Unwin =

New Zealand-British neurobiologist

Peter Nigel Tripp Unwin FRS is a British scientist at the MRC Laboratory of Molecular Biology, where he was Head of the Neurobiology Division from 1992 until 2008. He is currently also emeritus Professor of Cell Biology at the Scripps Research Institute.

== Life ==
Nigel Unwin was born in New Zealand. He was a Ph.D. student in the Department of Metallurgy Cambridge University from 1965 to 1968, and then took a position at the MRC Laboratory of Molecular Biology from 1968 to 1980. He was Professor of Cell Biology at Stanford University from 1980 to 1987. In 1988 he returned to the MRC Laboratory of Molecular Biology, taking also a joint appointment at the Scripps Research Institute.

== Works ==
- Unwin N (2015), "Experiments in electron microscopy: from metals to nerves" Physica Scripta 90:048002
- Zuber B, Unwin N (2013), "The structure and superorganization of acetylcholine receptor-rapsyn complexes" Proceedings of the National Academy of Sciences 110:10622-10627
- Unwin N, Fujiyoshi Y (2012), "Gating movement of acetylcholine receptor caught by plunge-freezing" Journal of Molecular Biology 422:617-634
- O'Brien J, Unwin N (2006), "Organization of spines on the dendrites of Purkinje cells" Proceedings of the National Academy of Sciences 103:1575-1580
- Unwin N (2005), "Refined structure of the nicotinic acetylcholine receptor at 4Å resolution", Journal of Molecular Biology 346:967-989
- Miyazawa A, Fujiyoshi Y, Unwin N (2003), "Structure and gating mechanism of the acetylcholine receptor pore" Nature 423:949-955
- Unwin N (1995), "Acetylcholine receptor channel imaged in the open state" Nature 373:37-43
- Berriman J, Unwin N (1994), "Analysis of transient structures by cryo-microscopy combined with rapid mixing of spray droplets" Ultramicroscopy 56:241-252
- Toyoshima C, Unwin N (1988), "Ion channel of acetylcholine receptor reconstructed from images of postsynaptic membranes" Nature 336:247-250
- Toyoshima C, Unwin N (1988), "Contrast transfer for frozen-hydrated specimens: determination from pairs of defocussed images" Ultramicroscopy 25:279-292
- Brisson A, Unwin P N T (1985), "Quaternary structure of the acetylcholine receptor" Nature 315:474-477
- Unwin P N T, Milligan R A (1982), "A large particle associated with the perimeter of the nuclear pore complex" Journal of Cell Biology 93:63-75
- Unwin P N T, Zampighi G (1980), "Structure of the junction between communicating cells" Nature 283:545-549
- Unwin P N T (1977), "Three-dimensional model of membrane-bound ribosomes obtained by electron microscopy" Nature 269:118-122
- Henderson R, Unwin P N T (1975), "Three-dimensional model of purple membrane obtained by electron microscopy" Nature 257:28-32
- Unwin P N T, Henderson R (1975), "Molecular structure determination by electron microscopy of unstained crystalline specimens" Journal of Molecular Biology 94:425-440
- Unwin P N T (1971), "Phase contrast and interference microscopy with the electron microscope" Phil. Trans. Roy. Soc. Lond. B261:95-104

== Honors ==
Unwin was elected a Fellow of the Royal Society (FRS) in 1983, and of Trinity College, Cambridge in 1987. He is an Honorary Fellow of the Royal Microscopical Society and a Fellow of the Academy of Medical Sciences. His awards include the Rosenstiel Award for Basic Medical Research (1991), the Louis-Jeantet Prize for Medicine (1996), the Gregori Aminoff Prize in Crystallography (1999), and the Royal Society Croonian Lecture and Medal (2000).
