= Shaanxi University of Technology =

Public University in Shanxi, China

- 陝西理工大学
- Motto: 明德 砺志 博学 笃行
- Type: Public
- Established: 1958
- President: Zhang Shemin simplified Chinese: 张社民; traditional Chinese: 張社民; pinyin: Zhang Shemin)
- Faculty: 1,267 (2017)
- Students: 20,000 (2017)
- Location: Hanzhong, China
- Campus: Urban 4,734 ha
- Colors: Red and White
- Website: www.snut.edu.cn

The Shaanxi University of Technology (SUT; simplified Chinese: 陕西理工大学; traditional Chinese: 陝西理工大學; pinyin: Shǎnxī Lǐgōng Daxué) is a post-secondary educational institution in Hanzhong, Shaanxi, China.

== History ==
It was established in June 2001 when the Shaanxi Institute of Technology and the Hanzhong Teacher's College merged with the approval of the Ministry of Education.

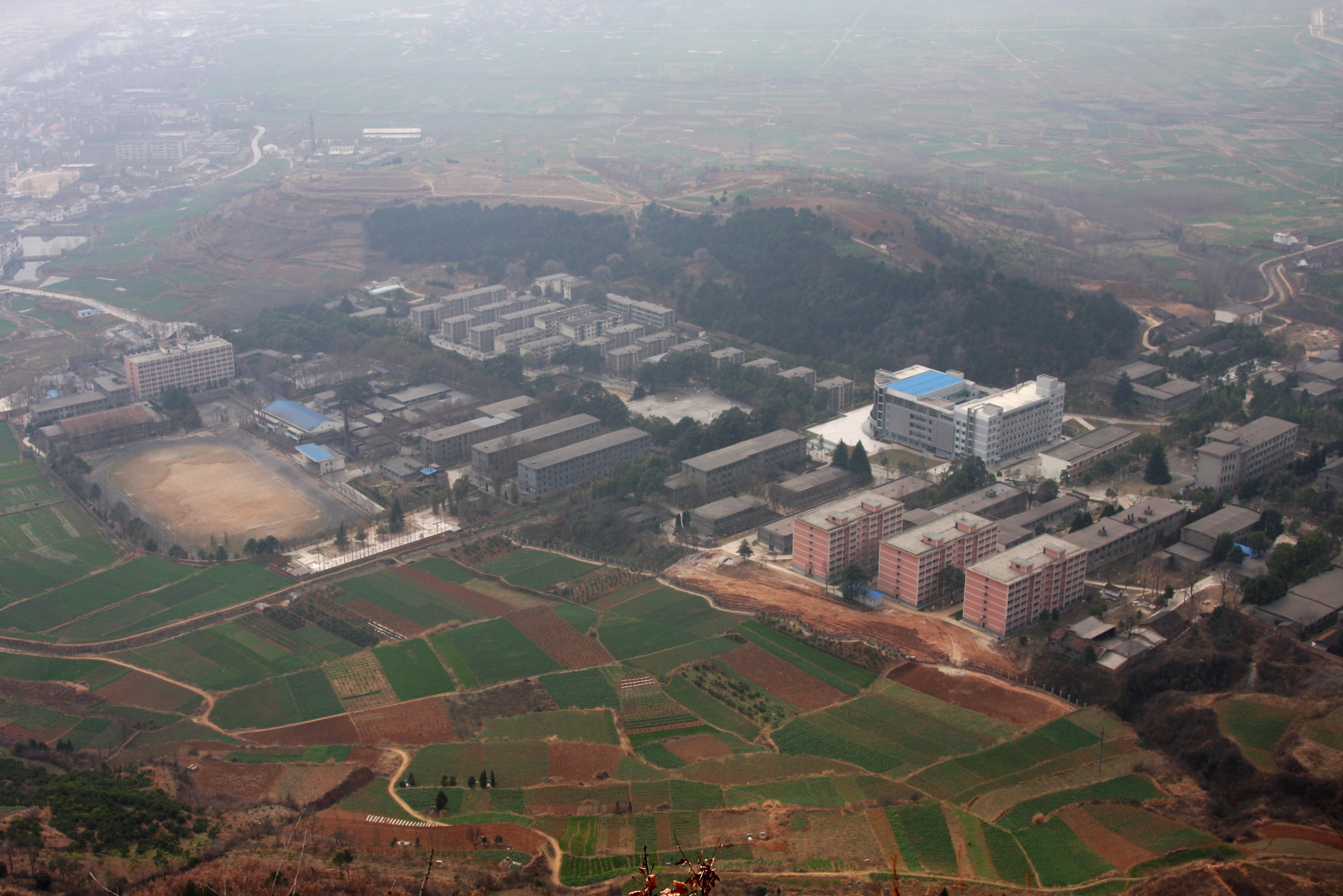
Shaanxi University of Technology on 14 February 2009.
