= Olex2 =

Olex and Olex2 are versatile software for crystallographic research. Olex used to be a research project developed during PhD to implement topological (as connectivity) analysis of polymeric chemical structures and still is widely used around the world. Olex2 is an open source project with the C++ code portable to Windows, Mac and Linux. Although the projects share the common name they are not related at the source code level.

== Olex ==
The Olex program is designed for the analysis of extended structural networks. It only runs on Windows systems and source code is available only on request. It allows packing the structure, constructing the topological network and the evaluation of the networks Schläfli and vertex symbols and to produce raster pictures of the model visible on screen. This kind of the topological network analysis is normally done to find relevance of considered structures and possibly to predict physical properties of the investigated material.

Olex2 is a relatively mature open source software with a BSD licence which provides tools for crystallographic structure solution, refinement, and final report preparation. It is still in the stage of active development. Olex2 provides numerous tools for structure analysis and publication, including Fourier maps, void calculation and visualisation, space group determination, calculation of esd's for almost any possible geometrical parameters, CIF translation to HTML and other document formats, hydrogen atom placement, and many others. Olex2 can also provide the final graphic output as raster images or PostScript, Ortep-like or POV-Ray output.

The independent GUI for the Olex2 platform is provided by wxWidgets. Olex2 has an extended HTML based interface, enhanced by Pillow and OpenGL graphics. The software is provided as pre-built binaries for Windows, Mac and Linux as well as in the source code form. Several build scripts (SCons, CMake and make) are provided to help with Olex2 development, but only SCons is supported throughout and used for each release update. Any problems and bugs have to be reported to the supporters, now under OlexSys Ltd.

As a GUI Olex2 is built from two components - the Olex2 core, written in C++ and exposing the underlying model to the GUI, which is mostly based on Python code. This segregation allows extending Olex2 with custom scripts and exploiting its functionality by the user at various levels, such as Miller index operations, file manipulations, and many others.

Olex2 provides a set of commercial extensions:

- 3DPlus: provides a way to output STL, VRML and PLY files for 3D printing
- ReportPlus: professional-looking structure determination reports including the ability to combine structures

== Official Site ==
http://www.olexsys.org
