= Ram Sasisekharan =

Indian researcher

- Born: 1965 (age 60–61); India
- Education: Bangalore University (BS); Harvard University (MS, PhD)
- Known for: Glycomics – role of glycans in health; Monoclonal antibody therapy
- Scientific career
- Fields: Biomedical sciences
- Workplaces: Massachusetts Institute of Technology; Koch Institute for Integrative Cancer Research
- Doctoral advisor: Robert S. Langer

Ram Sasisekharan (born 1965 ) is an Indian-American researcher and bioengineer at the Massachusetts Institute of Technology (MIT). Best known for leading the international team that identified oversulfated chondroitin sulfate as a contaminant in the US heparin supply in 2007 and 2008, he had developed antibodies for dengue, yellow fever, Zika and SARS-CoV-2 infections.

Sasisekharan joined the MIT's faculty of biological engineering in 1996, became full professor in 2003, and Director of the Harvard–MIT Program in Health Sciences and Technology from 2008 to 2012. Since then, he is the Alfred H. Caspary Professor of Biological Engineering and Health Sciences and Technology at the MIT's Koch Institute for Integrative Cancer Research. He is also a principal investigator of the Infectious Diseases Interdisciplinary Research Group under the Singapore-MIT Alliance for Research and Technology.

Sasisekharan's research in glycomics and antibodies, with authorship of about 200 scientific papers, led him found six biotechnological companies for which he is a named inventor on 205 United States patent applications in 2023. His PhD research, supervised by Robert S. Langer, on cloning and sequencing of the enzyme, heparinase, led to the creation of his first biotechnological company, Momenta Pharmaceuticals, which was later acquired by Johnson & Johnson.

== Background and personal life ==
Sasisekharan was born in India in 1965. His father, V. Sasisekharan (Viswanathan Sasisekharan), is an Indian biophysicist whose research involves the structure of biomolecules including that of DNA. Sasisekharan's wife, Uma Narayanasami, is an oncologist certified in hematology and medical oncology practicing at Mass General Cancer Center at Emerson Hospital in Concord, Massachusetts. She has also collaborated in the fight against cancer and has had several publications focused on heparinase and its potential to limit tumor growth by releasing certain sugars from the surface cells of cancer.

== Education ==
Sasisekharan studied physical sciences at Bangalore University from where he obtained a B.Sc. degree in 1985. He completed M.Sc. in biophysics from Harvard University, and earned a Ph.D. in medical sciences from Harvard Medical School. For his thesis, Sasisekharan wanted to work on a topic nobody had wanted. His advisor and mentor, Robert S. Langer, assigned him on cloning of a protein, heparinase. He earned his doctorate in 1992. He later described the problem by comparing his work with DNA sequencing: "Sequencing DNA is like walking through a ladder, but sequencing sugars is more like putting a puzzle together."

== Early career ==
Sasisekharan's PhD work, under the supervision of Langer, was one which most researchers avoided due to the difficulty and risk. It involved characterizing and sequencing the components of heparinase, a critical enzyme that degrades or cuts up the sugars in the heparin family. In the early 1990s, Sasisekharan devised a novel approach of using polymerase chain reaction (PCR) to clone the enzyme in just eight weeks. This first-in-class cloned enzyme became the subject of Sasisekharan's first patent, US 5,389,539, which was filed in 1992. From 2007 to 2008, the US Food and Drug Administration FDA approached Sasisekharan to use his glycan sequencing technology to identify the source of a contaminated batch of heparin. Weeks later, the Sasisekharan lab helped identify the contamination source as oversulfated chondroitin sulfate.

Sasisekharan joined the MIT faculty in 1996, received tenure in 2001, and advanced to full professor in 2003. From 2008 to 2012, Sasisekharan was the Edward Hood Taplin Professor of Health Sciences and Technology and Director of the Harvard-MIT Program in Health Sciences and Technology.

== Research ==
=== Protein sequencing ===
Considered a pioneer of the emerging and essential field of glycomics, Sasisekharan and his lab were the first to conduct detailed studies of a class of glycan-degrading enzymes that were revealed to be critical tools in uncovering fundamental biological roles of glycans in significant health conditions, including cancer, cardiovascular biology, and infectious diseases. In addition, Sasisekharan's approach to studying glycans has led to several technology platforms which launched the company Momenta in 2001 and yielded novel translational applications for disease processes and understanding structure-function relationships. Because of this expertise, the FDA requested Sasisekharan's assistance during the US heparin crisis.

=== Infectious diseases ===
Work at the Sasisekharan lab led to an understanding of the mutation risk for avian or bird flu and swine flu and the need for development of rapid response capabilities for emerging infectious diseases.

=== Antibody development ===
The Sasisekharan lab in conjunction with the Singapore-MIT Alliance for Research and Technology (SMART) in Singapore focused on responding rapidly to infectious disease outbreaks from both a technical and regulatory perspective, and initiated a series of antibody programs with increasing speed of development. The lab first developed an improved dengue fever antibody, named monoclonal antibody (mAb) 513 that was reported in 2018. The next program was in yellow fever. A yellow fever antibody named TY014 was developed in 2019, an Investigational New Drug (IND) application was filed in seven months. Clinical trial started the next year.

Sasisekharan's lab was the first to produce antibodies for the treatments of influenza A virus and Zika virus infections. The antibody for influenza (H7N9) disease was named VIS410, and the development was reported in the Proceedings of the National Academy of Sciences in 2015. The antibody for Zika virus was called ZAb_FLEP as reported in the Cell Host & Microbe in 2018. An IND was filed for Zika antibody within nine months of initiation.

The most recent program developed a SARS-CoV-2 antibody which went from design to first human infusion in four months in 2020.

=== Heparin crisis ===
Towards the end of 2007 and early 2008, there were reports of people developing allergic reactions after having an injection of heparin sodium. 150 people died in US, with hundreds of clinical cases in other parts of the world. An investigation by FDA from January 2008 identified that the majority of the drug came from Baxter International. Baxter immediately recalled al its heparin products. As cases were also reported in other countries, a global recall was done by various manufacturers. The incidence was known as the heparin crisis.

Sasisekharan led the research team that included scientists from MIT, Koch Institute, Center for Drug Evaluation and Research, and Centers for Disease Control and Prevention. The team reported their findings in Nature Biotechnology that heparin was contaminated with over-sulfated chondroitin sulfate, a highly immune activator. In subsequent reports in The New England Journal of Medicine, the team concluded that heparin contaminated with over-sulfated chondroitin sulfate was the cause of adverse effects and deaths.

== Entrepreneurial activities ==
Sasisekharan's PhD research led to the development of glycan sequencing platform. With his supervisor, Langer, he established Momenta Pharmaceuticals in 2001, which was eventually acquired by Johnson & Johnson for US$6.5 billion. During his 12-year tenure on Momenta's board, Sasisekharan provided input on the company's first commercial drug, which is a low-cost, highly potent version of the blood-thinner Lovenox, which is a low molecular weight heparan (LMWH). To complete development and commercialize this generic version of Lovenox, Momenta formed a collaboration with a division of Novartis.

Sasisekharan has founded six companies. Sasisekharan co-founded Cerulean in 2006 to leverage nanopharmaceuticals to target tumors with highly potent chemotherapeutics.

Sasisekharan also founded Visterra Inc., a company focused on the development of antibody-based treatments for kidney diseases and other hard-to-treat conditions like cancer and infectious. In 2018, Otsuka Pharmaceutical acquired the company for US$430 million. In 2015, he co-founded Tychan, a Singapore-based company for the development of antibodies for infectious diseases such as COVID-19.

Sasisekharan serves on the advisory board for multiple biotechnology companies, venture fundings, and non-profit organizations that are engaged in biotechnological developments.

== Misconduct allegations and exoneration ==
=== Accusation ===
In 2019, scientists at a competitor to Visterra, Inc., Adimab LLC, led by Tillman Gerngross and Karl Dane Wittrup (Sasisekharan's colleague at MIT) published a technical criticism in mAbs of Sasisekharan's papers, the development of VIS410 reported in the Proceedings of the National Academy of Sciences in 2015 and that of ZAb_FLEP reported in the Cell Host & Microbe in 2018. The mAbs paper was submitted on April 16, 2019, and accepted two days later, and published as a "Perspective" (opinion) but in the form of an original research article. There was no proper peer reviewing. The scientists claimed that research data "show striking similarities" to published data. Data on VIS410 "produces exact matches to an earlier US patent" named Ab044 in 2013, as well as a "remarkable degree of similarity" with FI6v3 that was described in 2011 by a team of European scientists. They also remarked that ZAb_FLEP "leaves little doubt that ZAb_FLEP corresponds to mAb", a patent already filed by Sasisekharan's lab, and a "remarkable sequence similarity" to a paper in Nature published in 2016. They concluded: "We find it difficult to view these authors’ approach in any light other than an intent to mislead as to the level of originality and significance of the published work." The paper reviewer, William Schief, professor of immunology at the Scripps Research Institute, agreed that it was a “very strong case” against Sasisekharan for misconduct.

Sasisekharan responded that the criticism was "inaccurate and slanderous" as his papers and other papers had fundamental differences, further remarking that the mAbs paper was "founded on a baseless conjecture and filled with entirely false claims." Gerngross took the allegations further and publicly explained in a series of media interviews. An "internal complaint" against Sasisekharan was submitted to MIT in the spring of 2019. The MIT restricted Sasisekharan from making interactions with his team, and rebuttal to the accusations.

=== Exoneration ===
The MIT investigation took three and a half years, and the decision was announced in 2023. The MIT Vice President for Research, Maria T. Zuber, released a public statement on 14 March clearing Sasisekharan of the allegation charge, stating that: "MIT has completed its investigation with no finding of research misconduct for any of the submitted allegations." An explanation of the science was immediately provided on the website for the Sasisekharan Lab.

As Sasisekharan was exonerated from the charges of misconduct, the allegations turned the table on the mAbs authors. Peter Dedon, Sasisekharan's colleague, asserted that there are "big concerns" about the mAbs paper. The Adimab is a rival company to Sasisekharan's in antibody research, and Dedon believed that it was an attempt to discredit Sasisekharan for financial advantages, saying, "This is like corporate warfare being waged in an academic journal."

Since the mAbs paper was only an opinion piece, Dedon criticized the journal for not asking Sasisekharan's response. Sasisekharan claimed that he had no knowledge of the accusation until a reporter at The Wall Street Journal asked him of his opinion on the mAbs paper. As one of the leaders of Adimab, Wittrup was Sasisekharan's colleague, the issue could have been discussed and settled without public accusations. Sasisekharan remarked that publishing a criticism of journal articles in other journal "goes against scientific convention, in which disagreements are usually conducted in the same journal that published the paper being discussed."

Zuber announced that the MIT will "assist in fully restoring the reputations of Professor Sasisekharan and the members of his lab. In addition, we are committed to ensuring that Professor Sasisekharan and his lab can return to normal operation." An open letter to the Editor-in-Chief of mAbs was created on 13 June 2023 to retract the Adimab paper, which has been endorsed by scientists and supporters around the world. When inquired by the Nature correspondent, the editor-in-chief, Janice Reichert, did not make any response.

== Awards and honours ==
In 2005, the journal Nature named Sasisekharan as "Movers", remarking his works: "he's turned seemingly useless molecules into potential therapeutic drugs. It can't get much sweeter than that." He was awarded the Princess Chulabhorn Gold Medal in 2007 and remained an advisor to the Chulabhorn Research Institute of the Government of Thailand.

In 1999, Sasisekharan received the Beckman Young Investigators Award, the Burroughs Wellcome Fund Young Investigator Award in Pharmacological Sciences, and the Edgerly Science Partnership Award. He received the CaPCure Awards from the CaPCure Foundation (now the Prostate Cancer Foundation) in 1998, 1999, 2000, and 2001.

In 2009, Sasisekharan became elected Fellow of the American Institute for Medical and Biological Engineering. He received the MERIT Award from the U.S. National Institute of General Medical Sciences in 2010. In 2014, he became elected Fellow of the U.S. National Academy of Inventors. In 2017, he received the Agilent Thought Leader Award from the Agilent Technologies. In 2026, he was elected to the National Academy of Engineering.
