= Carbohydrate Structure Database =

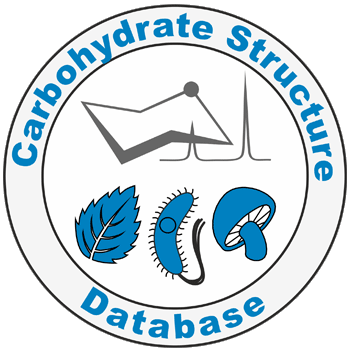

Content
- Description: Natural carbohydrate structures with NMR, bibliographic and biological annotations.
- Data types captured: carbohydrate structures and related data
- Organisms: archaea, bacteria, fungi, algae, higher plants

Contact
- Research center: Zelinsky Institute of Organic Chemistry
- Authors: Philip V. Toukach, Ksenia S. Egorova, Yuri A. Knirel, et al.
- Primary citation: Carbohydrate Structure Database
- Release date: 2005

Access
- Website: http://csdb.glycoscience.ru/
- Download URL: export feature in web-interface

Tools
- Web: GODDESS: glycan-oriented NMR spectrum simulation; GRASS: generation, ranking and assignment of saccharide structures; Coverage statistics; Taxon clustering; GT-explorer

Miscellaneous
- Versioning: yes
- Data release frequency: annual
- Version: 1 (merged)
- Curation policy: yes (manual and automatic)

Carbohydrate Structure Database (CSDB) is a free curated database and service platform in glycoinformatics, launched in 2005 by a group of Russian scientists from N.D. Zelinsky Institute of Organic Chemistry, Russian Academy of Sciences. CSDB stores published structural, taxonomical, bibliographic and NMR-spectroscopic data on natural carbohydrates and carbohydrate-related molecules.

== Overview ==
The main data stored in CSDB are carbohydrate structures of bacterial, fungal, and plant origin. Each structure is assigned to an organism and is provided with the link(s) to the corresponding scientific publication(s), in which it was described. Apart from structural data, CSDB also stores NMR spectra, information on methods used to decipher a particular structure, and some other data. CSDB provides access to several carbohydrate-related research tools:

- Simulation of 1D and 2D NMR spectra of carbohydrates (GODDESS: glycan-oriented database-driven empirical spectrum simulation).
- Automated NMR-based structure elucidation (GRASS: generation, ranking and assignment of saccharide structures).
- Statistical analysis of structural feature distribution in glycomes of living organisms
- Generation of optimized atomic coordinates for an arbitrary saccharide and subdatabase of conformation maps.
- Taxon clustering based on similarities of glycomes (carbohydrate-based tree of life)
- Glycosyltransferase subdatabase (GT-explorer)

== History and funding ==
Until 2015, Bacterial Carbohydrate Structure Database (BCSDB) and Plant&Fungal Carbohydrate Structure Database (PFCSDB) databases existed in parallel. In 2015, they were joined into the single Carbohydrate Structure Database (CSDB). The development and maintenance of CSDB have been funded by International Science and Technology Center (2005–2007), Russian Federation President grant program (2005–2006), Russian Foundation for Basic Research (2005–2007,2012-2014,2015-2017,2018-2020), Deutsches Krebsforschungszentrum (short-term in 2006–2010), and Russian Science Foundation (2018–2027).

== Data sources and coverage ==
The main sources of CSDB data are:

- Scientific publications indexed in the dedicated citation databases, including NCBI Pubmed and Thomson Reuters Web Of Science (>80% records).
- CCSD (Carbbank) database.

The data are selected and added to CSDB manually by browsing original scientific publications. The data originating from other databases are subject to error-correction and approval procedures. As of 2027, the coverage on bacteria, archaea, fungi, and protista is ca. 80% of carbohydrate structures published in scientific literature. Higher plants are covered up to 2000. The time lag between the publication of relative data and their deposition into CSDB is about 18 months. CSDB does not cover data from the animalia domain, except unicellular metazoa. There is a number of dedicated databases on animal carbohydrates, e.g. UniCarbKB or GLYCOSCIENCES.de.

CSDB is reported as one of the biggest projects in glycoinformatics. It is employed in structural studies of natural carbohydrates and in glyco-profiling. The content of CSDB has been used as a data source in other glycoinformatics projects.

== Deposited objects ==
- Molecular structures of glycans, glycopolymers and glycoconjugates: primary structure, aglycon information, polymerization degree and class of molecule. Structural scope includes molecules composed of residues (monosaccharides, alditols, amino acids, fatty acids etc.) linked by glycosidic, ester, amidic, ketal, phospho- or sulpho-diester bonds, in which at least one residue is a monosaccharide or its derivative.
- Bibliography associated with structures: imprint data, keywords, abstracts, IDs in bibliographic databases
- Biological context of structures: associated taxon, strain, serogroup, host organism, disease information. The covered domains are: prokaryotes, plants, fungi and selected pathogenic unicellular metazoa. The database contains only glycans originating from these domains or obtained by chemical modification of such glycans.
- Assigned NMR spectra and experimental conditions.
- Glycosyltransferases associated with taxons: gene and enzyme identifiers, full structures, donor and substrates, methods used to prove enzymatic activity, trustworthiness level.
- References to other databases
- Other data collected from original publications
- Conformation maps of disaccharides derived from molecular dynamics simulations.

== Interrelation with other databases ==
CSDB is cross-linked to other glycomics databases, such as MonosaccharideDB, Glycosciences.DE, NCBI Pubmed, NCBI Taxonomy, NLM catalog, International Classification of Diseases 11, etc. Besides a native notation, CSDB Linear, structures are presented in multiple carbohydrate notations (SNFG, SweetDB, GlycoCT, WURCS, GLYCAM, etc.). CSDB is exportable as a Resource Description Framework (RDF) feed according to the GlycoRDF ontology.
