= CCP4 =

CCP4 can refer to any one of the following:

- Collaborative Computational Project Number 4 — comprehensive collection of protein crystallography software
- CCP4 (file format) — An electron density file format used in molecular graphics
- Port Hope Simpson Airport — ICAO Canadian airport code: CCP4
