= V. Sasisekharan =

Indian biophysicist (born 1933)

- Born: 28 June 1933 (age 93); India
- Education: University of Madras
- Known for: Conformation of biopolymers
- Awards: 1978 Shanti Swarup Bhatnagar Prize; 1981 FICCI Award; 1983 INSA J. C. Bose Medal; 1985 Hari Om Ashram J. C. Bose Award; 1987 Watumull Honor Summus Medal; 1989 Om Prakash Bhasin Award
- Scientific career
- Fields: Molecular biology
- Workplaces: Indian Institute of Science; National Institutes of Health; University of Madras; Princeton University; University of California, San Francisco

Viswanathan Sasisekharan (born 1933) is an Indian biophysicist known for his work on the structure and conformation of biopolymers. He introduced the use of torsion angles to describe polypeptide and protein conformation, a central principle of the (φ, ψ) plot (later known as the Ramachandran plot). Additionally, he was the first to introduce alternative models of DNA structure that provided insights beyond the standard double helix model. For his contributions to the biological sciences, he was awarded the Shanti Swarup Bhatnagar Prize for Science and Technology, one of India’s highest science awards, in 1978.

== Education and career ==
V. Sasisekharan was born on 28 June 1933 in the South Indian state of Tamil Nadu. He earned his Ph.D. from the University of Madras in 1959. From 1959–1963, he was a lecturer at the University of Madras, and from 1963–1964, he was a visiting scientist at the National Institutes of Health (NIDDK). In 1964, he joined the University of Madras as a reader at the Centre of Advanced Study in Physics and served as a professor and administrative head of the Department of Physics from 1968–1970 and 1971–1972. He was a visiting professor at Princeton University at their Frick Chemical Laboratory from 1970–1971.

In 1972, Sasisekharan moved to the Indian Institute of Science (IISc) Bangalore, where he served as the professor and chairman of the Molecular Biophysics Unit; chairman of the Division of Chemical and Biological Sciences; and dean of the Faculty of Science. He was a visiting professor at the University of Chicago, and was an adjunct professor at the School of Pharmacy, University of California, San Francisco.

== Research ==
As a graduate student, Sasisekharan studied the structure of collagen chains and developed methods to generate the coordinates of constituent atoms of peptides with a high degree of accuracy. Using this approach and published crystal structures, he identified allowable non-bonded distances between atoms of consecutive amino acids. For the first time, he used torsion angles to describe the conformation of polypeptide chains and determined the allowable regions for the two torsion angles (originally named φ and φ’, later as φ and ψ). This formed the basis for the (φ, ψ) plot, which was expanded and later became known as the Ramachandran plot. While Sasisekharan calculated these allowable regions using only a few available protein crystal structures at the time, the (φ, ψ) plot has remained nearly unchanged for 60 years.

Later in his career, part of Sasisekharan’s work focused on the structure of nucleic acids. He and his coworkers demonstrated that the available experimental results were compatible with both right- and left-handed double helical models for DNA. They also showed the enormous degree of conformational flexibility in the basic units of DNA and highlighted the concept of sequence specific conformation and DNA conformational polymorphism. In addition, they proposed a structure of DNA consisting of alternating left- and right-handed helical segments, known as the side-by-side (S-B-S) model, an alternative to the right-handed double helix model. The S-B-S model offered greater structural flexibility that could facilitate the uncoiling of the double helix without topological rearrangement during replication or other processes.

His son, Ram Sasisekharan, is a bioengineer and a co-author of some of his publications.

== Awards and honors ==
The Council of Scientific and Industrial Research awarded Sasisekharan the Shanti Swarup Bhatnagar Prize (one of India’s highest science awards) in 1978 for his contributions to the fields of biopolymers and DNA structure analysis. He received the FICCI Award of the Federation of Indian Chamber of Commerce and Industry in 1981, and the Indian National Science Academy awarded him the Jagadis Chandra Bose Medal in 1983. In 1985, he held the ASTRA chair in Biological Sciences at the Indian Institute of Science and received the Jagdish Chandra Bose Award for Research in Life Sciences from the University Grants Commission of India. He was awarded the Honor Summus Medal of the Watunull Foundation in 1987 and was selected as a Fogarty Scholar-In-Residence at the National Institutes of Health in 1988. He received the Om Prakash Bhasin Award in 1989. Sasisekharan was elected fellow of the Indian Academy of Sciences in 1969 and fellow of the Indian National Science Academy in 1980.

== See also ==
- Ramachandran plot
- G. N. Ramachandran
- Nucleic acid double helix
