= UniCarb-DB =

Glycomics database

UniCarb-DB is a structural and mass spectrometric database used in glycomics. UniCarb-DB provides over 1000 LC-MS/MS spectra for N- and O-linked glycans released from glycoproteins that were manually annotated. Each entry contains reference to published work, information about structure, GlyToucan Accession Number, MS/MS fragmentation with complete peak lists, biological contexts and experimental metadata. The database was created by a collaboration between University of Gothenburg and Macquarie University and since November 2016 is hosted by Swiss Institute for Bioinformatics. The database is the first to implement the Minimum Information standard MIRAGE (Minimum Information Required About a Glycomics Experiment) for submission of glycomic MS/MS data into the database.
