= Bsoft =

Structural biology software

Bsoft is a collection of programs and a platform for development of software for image and molecular processing in structural biology. Problems in structural biology are approached with a highly modular design, allowing fast development of new algorithms without the burden of issues such as file I/O. It provides an easily accessible interface, a resource that can be and has been used in other packages. Several workflows such as for single particle analysis and tomography are supported with parameter exchange as well as the ability to do distributed processing across heterogeneous clusters of computers.

== Technical details ==
Version: 1.8.8

OS support: Unix (Mac OS X, IRIX, Linux, AIX, Solaris, Tru64), OpenVMS

Format support:

- Images: BioRad, Brix, CCP4, Digital Instruments, Digital Micrograph, DSN6, EM, Goodford, GRD, Imagic, JPEG, MFF, Image Magick, MRC, PIC, PIF, PNG, Spider, Suprim, TIFF, RAW
- Micrograph parameters: STAR (Bsoft dictionary), XML (Bsoft schema), EMX (EM exchange format schema)
- Sequences: EMBL, Fasta, Genbank, Phylip, PIR, STAR, Text
- Molecular modeling: Gromacs, PDB, STAR/mmCIF, Text, WAH
- General modeling: Chimera marker model, STAR (Bsoft dictionary), XML (Bsoft schema)

== Bibliography ==
- Heymann JB (2001) Bsoft: Image and molecular processing in electron microscopy. Journal of Structural Biology 133(2/3), 156 - 169.
- Heymann JB, Cardone G, Winkler DC and Steven AC (2008) Computational resources for cryo-electron tomography in Bsoft. Journal of Structural Biology 161(3), 232 – 242.
- Heymann JB (2018) Guidelines for using Bsoft for high resolution reconstruction and validation of biomolecular structures from electron micrographs. Protein Science 27(1), 159-171.
- Heymann JB (2018) Single particle reconstruction and validation using Bsoft for the Map Challenge. Journal of Structural Biology 204(1), 90-95.

== See also ==
- EM Data Bank
