= Glyquest =

Glyquest is a software tool to help glycomics researchers to determine asparagine-linked glycan (N-glycan) structures based on collision-induced dissociation (CID) tandem mass spectra (MS/MS) of glycopeptides. It has a large built-in N-glycan structure database and a database search engine.
