= Paul Emsley (crystallographer) =

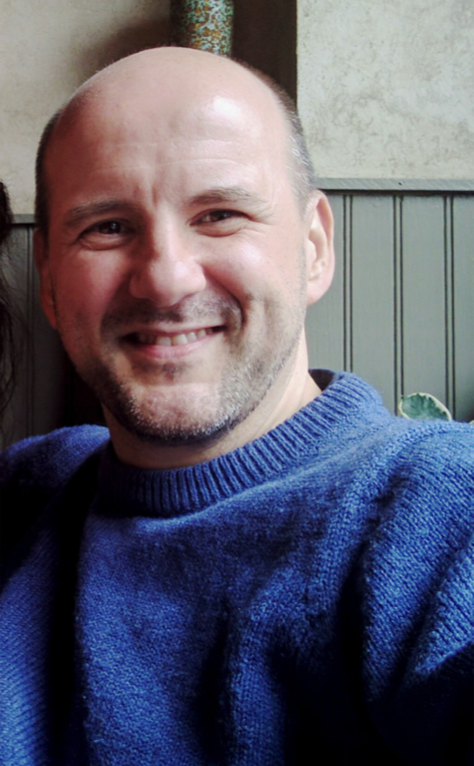
- 2016
- Born: 16 March 1966 (age 59)
- Known for: Coot (software)

Paul Emsley is a British crystallographer at the MRC Laboratory of Molecular Biology in Cambridge. He works as an independent scientist and is a member of the Computational Crystallography Group headed by Garib Murshudov.

Emsley is the primary author of the model-building software Coot, a tool for building models of proteins whose three dimensional structures are determined via X-ray crystallography or cryo-EM. These protein structures are deposited at the Worldwide Protein Data Bank for collaboration among scientists. Since its introduction in 2004, Coot has remained as free software for use in industrial and academic research groups.

Emsley has given lectures and tutorials on model-building and validation at Cold Spring Harbor Laboratory and as CCP4 courses, where he is also a developer and contributor.
