= GlycomeDB =

Content
- Description: carbohydrate structures

Contact
- Laboratory: German Cancer Research Center, Heidelberg, Germany.
- Authors: René Ranzinger
- Primary citation: Ranzinger & al. (2011)
- Release date: 2008

Access
- Website: http://www.glycome-db.org

GlycomeDB is a database of carbohydrates including structural and taxonomic data.

GlycomeDB is no longer maintained; according to the GlycomeDB website, its mission ended with the implementation of GlyTouCan, which now serves as the international glycan structure repository.

== See also ==
- Glycomics
