= Gopinath Kartha =

Indian crystallographer

- Born: 26 January 1927; Cherthala, Kerala, India
- Died: 18 June 1984 (aged 57)
- Education: University of Madras; Andhra University
- Scientific career
- Fields: Crystallography
- Workplaces: Tata Institute of Fundamental Research; Cavendish Laboratory; National Research Council of Canada; Brooklyn Polytechnic Institute; Roswell Park Comprehensive Cancer Center
- Academic advisors: G.N. Ramachandran

Gopinath Kartha (26 January 1927 – 18 June 1984) was a crystallographer of Indian origin. In 1967, he determined the molecular structure of the enzyme ribonuclease.

== Early life and education ==
Gopinath Kartha was born in Cherthala, near Alappuzha in the state of Kerala, India. He went to school at Sanathanadharma Vidya Sala in Alappuzha. His undergraduate diploma in Math, Physics, and Chemistry was from University College, Thiruvananthapuram(Trivandrum). He obtained his B.Sc. in physics in 1950 from the University of Madras, Chennai, Tamil Nadu, India. He obtained another B.Sc. in mathematics from Andhra University in Visakhapatnam in 1951.

He began his graduate studies in 1952 at the Indian Institute of Science in Bangalore but followed his advisor G.N. Ramachandran back to the University of Madras. As a graduate student, he and Ramachandran worked on the triple helix structure of the collagen molecule. He completed his Ph.D. in 1953.

== Career ==
In 1959, he moved to the Brooklyn Polytechnic Institute to work with Dr. David Harker and Dr. Jake Bello. Later that year, the entire Brooklyn Polytechnic Institute's crystallography group moved to Roswell Park Comprehensive Cancer Center in Buffalo, New York. He stayed at Roswell Park until the end of his life. In 1972 he spent eight months as a visiting professor of biophysics at Kyoto University.
