= G. N. Ramachandran =

Indian physicist (1922–2001)

G.N. Ramachandran
- Born: 8 October 1922; Ernakulam, Kingdom of Cochin, British India
- Died: 7 April 2001 (aged 78); Chennai, India
- Education: University of Madras (BSc, MSc, D.Sc); University of Cambridge (PhD)
- Known for: Ramachandran plot
- Scientific career
- Fields: Biophysics
- Workplaces: St. Joseph's College, Tiruchirappalli; Madras University; Indian Institute of Science; Cavendish Laboratory
- Doctoral advisor: C V Raman

Gopalasamudram Narayanan Ramachandran, or G. N. Ramachandran, FRS (8 October 1922 – 7 April 2001) was an Indian physicist who was known for his work that led to his creation of the Ramachandran plot for understanding peptide structure. He was the first to propose a triple-helical model for the structure of collagen. He subsequently went on to make other major contributions in biology and physics.

== Early life and education ==
Ramachandran was born on 8 October 1922, in Ernakulam, Kingdom of Cochin, to Tamil parents G. R. Narayana Iyer, a teacher and principal of Maharaja's College, and Lakshmi Ammal. He completed his BSc honours in Physics from St Joseph's College, Tiruchirappalli in 1939. He joined the Indian Institute of Science, Bangalore in 1942 in the Electrical Engineering Department. Quickly realising his interest in physics, he switched to the Department of Physics to complete his master's and doctoral thesis under the supervision of Nobel laureate C. V. Raman. In 1942, he received a master's degree in physics from Madras University with his thesis submitted from Bangalore (he did not attend any Madras college at that time). He subsequently received his D.Sc. degree in 1947. Here he mostly studied crystal physics and crystal optics. During his studies he created an X-ray focusing mirror for the X-ray microscope. The resulting field of crystal topography is used in studies involving crystal growth and solid-state reactivity.

Ramachandran then spent two years (1947–1949) at the Cavendish Laboratory in Cambridge, where he earned his PhD for 'studies on X-ray diffuse scattering and its application to determination of elastic constants' under the direction of William Alfred Wooster, a leading crystallography expert.

== Research works ==
After completing his PhD, he returned to the Indian Institute of Science, Bangalore, India in 1949 as an assistant professor of physics. In 1952, he moved to Madras University as professor and head of the Department of Physics where he continued his work on crystal physics. His interest, however, shifted to the structure of biological macromolecules. Using X-ray diffraction Ramachandran along with Gopinath Kartha proposed and published the triple helical structure of collagen in 1954 in the journal Nature, drawing worldwide scientific attention to the "Madras group".

At Madras University, Professor Ramachandran was the favourite of the famous vice-chancellor and celebrated doctor and medical scientist, Sir Arcot Laksmanaswamy Mudaliar. Wanting to tackle problems at a more fundamental level, Ramachandran decided to use this information to examine the various polypeptide conformations then known and also to develop a good 'yardstick' that could be used for examining and assessing any structure in general, but peptides in particular. The result which emerged from these calculations in 1962, – now commonly known as the Ramachandran plot – was published in the Journal of Molecular Biology in 1963 and has become an essential tool in the field of protein conformation. When it was first calculated, crystal structures had barely been obtained for any protein. From the mid-1960s onward, Ramachandran continued studying crystallography, including the conformation of peptides including types of β-turns, conformation of prolyl residues, cis-peptide units, occurrence and need for non-planarity of the peptides, NMR coupling constants and peptides containing L and D residues, among other tops.

He was awarded the prestigious Jawarharlal Nehru Fellowship in 1968 for research on Protein and Polypeptide Conformation; he was one of its first recipients. Ramachandran can be credited for bringing together into the one field of molecular biophysics the then disparate fields of X-ray crystallography, peptide synthesis, NMR and other optical studies, and physico-chemical experimentation. In 1970, he founded the Molecular Biophysics Unit at the Indian Institute of Science which was later known as the Centre of Advanced Study in Biophysics.

Ramachandran and A.V. Lakshminarayanan developed convolution-backprojection algorithms which greatly improved the quality and practicality of results obtainable by x-ray tomography. Compared to previously used methods, their algorithms considerably reduced computer processing time for image reconstruction, as well as providing more numerically accurate images. As a result, commercial manufacturers of x-ray tomographic scanners started building systems capable of reconstructing high resolution images that were almost photographically perfect. In 1971, they published their research in PNAS.

In 1981, Ramachandran became a founding member of the World Cultural Council.

Notable awards that Ramachandran received include the Shanti Swarup Bhatnagar Award for Physics in India (1961) and the Fellowship of the Royal Society of London. In 1999, the International Union of Crystallography honoured him with the Ewald Prize for his 'outstanding contributions to crystallography'. He was nominated for the Nobel Prize as well for his fundamental contributions in protein structure and function.

== Later life and legacy ==
Ramachandran was devastated by the death of his wife Rajalakshmi in 1998 and his health gradually deteriorated. During the last few years of his life, he suffered a stroke and was affected by Parkinson's disease. Ramachandran died on 7 April 2001, aged 78, in Chennai.

Each year, the Council of Scientific and Industrial Research (CSIR) awards the "G N Ramachandran Gold Medal for Excellence in Biological Sciences & Technology" in his memory for work in Biological Sciences & Technology.
