= Glycomics =

Study of glycomes

Glycomics is the comprehensive study of glycomes (the entire complement of sugars, whether free or present in more complex molecules of an organism), including genetic, physiologic, pathologic, and other aspects. Glycomics "is the systematic study of all glycan structures of a given cell type or organism" and is a subset of glycobiology. The term glycomics is derived from the chemical prefix for sweetness or a sugar, "glyco-", and was formed to follow the omics naming convention established by genomics (which deals with genes) and proteomics (which deals with proteins).

== Challenges ==
- The complexity of sugars: regarding their structures, they are not linear instead they are highly branched. Moreover, glycans can be modified (modified sugars), this increases its complexity.
- Complex biosynthetic pathways for glycans.
- Usually glycans are found either bound to protein (glycoprotein) or conjugated with lipids (glycolipids).
- Unlike genomes, glycans are highly dynamic.

This area of research has to deal with an inherent level of complexity not seen in other areas of applied biology. 68 building blocks (molecules for DNA, RNA and proteins; categories for lipids; types of sugar linkages for saccharides) provide the structural basis for the molecular choreography that constitutes the entire life of a cell. DNA and RNA have four building blocks each (the nucleosides or nucleotides). Lipids are divided into eight categories based on ketoacyl and isoprene. Proteins have 20 (the amino acids). Saccharides have 32 types of sugar linkages. While these building blocks can be attached only linearly for proteins and genes, they can be arranged in a branched array for saccharides, further increasing the degree of complexity.

Add to this the complexity of the numerous proteins involved, not only as carriers of carbohydrate, the glycoproteins, but proteins specifically involved in binding and reacting with carbohydrate:

- Carbohydrate-specific enzymes for synthesis, modulation, and degradation
- Lectins, carbohydrate-binding proteins of all sorts
- Receptors, circulating or membrane-bound carbohydrate-binding receptors

== Importance ==
To answer this question one should know the different and important functions of glycans. The following are some of those functions:

- Glycoproteins and Glycolipids found on the cell surface play a critical role in bacterial and viral recognition.
- They are involved in cellular signaling pathways and modulate cell function.
- They are important in innate immunity.
- They determine cancer development.
- They orchestrate the cellular fate, inhibit proliferation, regulate circulation and invasion.
- They affect the stability and folding of proteins.
- They affect the pathway and fate of glycoproteins.
- There are many glycan-specific diseases, often hereditary diseases.

There are important medical applications of aspects of glycomics:

- Lectins fractionate cells to avoid graft-versus-host disease in hematopoietic stem cell transplantation.
- Activation and expansion of cytolytic CD8 T cells in cancer treatment.

Glycomics is particularly important in microbiology because glycans play diverse roles in bacterial physiology. Research in bacterial glycomics could lead to the development of:

- novel drugs
- bioactive glycans
- glycoconjugate vaccines

== Tools used ==
The following are examples of the commonly used techniques in glycan analysis

=== High-resolution mass spectrometry (MS) and high-performance liquid chromatography (HPLC) ===
The most commonly applied methods are MS and HPLC, in which the glycan part is cleaved either enzymatically or chemically from the target and subjected to analysis. In case of glycolipids, they can be analyzed directly without separation of the lipid component.

N-glycans from glycoproteins are analyzed routinely by high-performance-liquid-chromatography (reversed phase, normal phase and ion exchange HPLC) after tagging the reducing end of the sugars with a fluorescent compound (reductive labeling). A large variety of different labels were introduced in the recent years, where 2-aminobenzamide (AB), anthranilic acid (AA), 2-aminopyridin (PA), 2-aminoacridone (AMAC) and 3-(acetylamino)-6-aminoacridine (AA-Ac) are just a few of them.

O-glycans are usually analysed without any tags, due to the chemical release conditions preventing them to be labeled.

Fractionated glycans from high-performance liquid chromatography (HPLC) instruments can be further analyzed by MALDI-TOF-MS(MS) to get further information about structure and purity. Sometimes glycan pools are analyzed directly by mass spectrometry without prefractionation, although a discrimination between isobaric glycan structures is more challenging or even not always possible. Anyway, direct MALDI-TOF-MS analysis can lead to a fast and straightforward illustration of the glycan pool.

In recent years, high performance liquid chromatography online coupled to mass spectrometry became very popular. By choosing porous graphitic carbon as a stationary phase for liquid chromatography, even non derivatized glycans can be analyzed. Electrospray ionisation (ESI) is frequently used for this application.

=== Multiple Reaction Monitoring (MRM) ===
Although MRM has been used extensively in metabolomics and proteomics, its high sensitivity and linear response over a wide dynamic range make it especially suited for glycan biomarker research and discovery. MRM is performed on a triple quadrupole (QqQ) instrument, which is set to detect a predetermined precursor ion in the first quadrupole, a fragmented in the collision quadrupole, and a predetermined fragment ion in the third quadrupole. It is a non-scanning technique, wherein each transition is detected individually and the detection of multiple transitions occurs concurrently in duty cycles. This technique is being used to characterize the immune glycome.

Table 1: Advantages and disadvantages of mass spectrometry in glycan analysis

Advantages	Disadvantages
Applicable for small sample amounts (lower fmol range); Useful for complex glycan mixtures (generation of a further analysis dimension).; Attachment sides can be analysed by tandem MS experiments (side specific glycan analysis).; Glycan sequencing by tandem MS experiments.	Destructive method.; Need of a proper experimental design.

=== Arrays ===
Lectin and antibody arrays provide high-throughput screening of many samples containing glycans. This method uses either naturally occurring lectins or artificial monoclonal antibodies, where both are immobilized on a certain chip and incubated with a fluorescent glycoprotein sample.

Glycan arrays, like that offered by the Consortium for Functional Glycomics and Z Biotech LLC, contain carbohydrate compounds that can be screened with lectins or antibodies to define carbohydrate specificity and identify ligands.

=== Metabolic and covalent labeling of glycans ===
Metabolic labeling of glycans can be used as a way to detect glycan structures. A well known strategy involves the use of azide-labeled sugars which can be reacted using the Staudinger ligation. This method has been used for in vitro and in vivo imaging of glycans.

=== Tools for glycoproteins ===
X-ray crystallography and nuclear magnetic resonance (NMR) spectroscopy for complete structural analysis of complex glycans is a difficult and complex field. However, the structure of the binding site of numerous lectins, enzymes and other carbohydrate-binding proteins has revealed a wide variety of the structural basis for glycome function. The purity of test samples have been obtained through chromatography (affinity chromatography etc.) and analytical electrophoresis (PAGE (polyacrylamide electrophoresis), capillary electrophoresis, affinity electrophoresis, etc.).

== Software and databases ==
There are several online software and databases available for glycomics research. This includes:

- GlyCosmos
- GlyTouCan
- GlyGen
- GlycomeDB
- UniCarb-DB

== See also ==
- Cytomics
- Glycobiology
- GlycomeDB
- UniCarb-DB
- Carbohydrate Structure Database (CSDB)
- Glycoconjugate
- Glyquest
- Interactomics
- Lipidomics
- List of omics topics in biology
- Metabolomics
- Omics
- Proteomics
- systems biology
- Minimum Information Required About a Glycomics Experiment
