= CCP4 (file format) =

Electron density file format

ccp4
- Filename extension: .ccp4
- Type of format: electron density file

The CCP4 file format is file generated by the Collaborative Computational Project Number 4 in 1979. The file format for electron density has become industry standard in X-ray crystallography and Cryo-electron microscopy where the result of the technique is a three-dimensional grid of voxels each with a value corresponding to density of electrons (see wave function) The CCP4 format is supported by almost every molecular graphics suite that supports volumetric data. The major packages include:

- Visual molecular dynamics
- PyMOL
- UCSF Chimera
- Bsoft
- Coot
- MOE

== See also ==
- MTZ (file format)
- MRC (file format)
- EZD (file format)
- Chemical file format
  - Protein Data Bank (file format)
- Voxel - one way of presenting 3D densities
