= Peter Dedon =

American engineer

Peter Dedon is an American engineer who is currently the Underwood-Prescott Professor of Biological Engineering at Massachusetts Institute of Technology.
