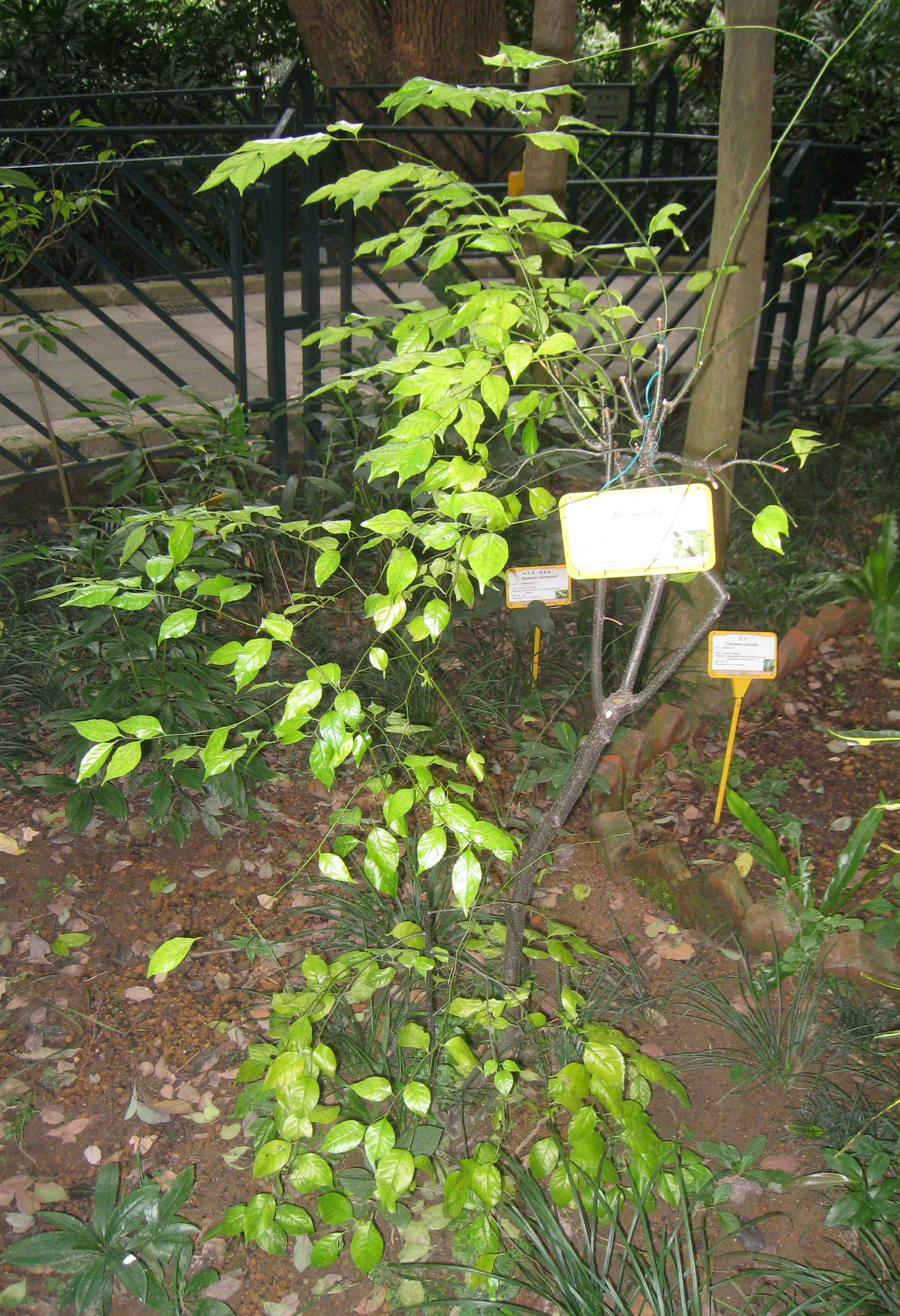
- Ilex asprella - Hong Kong Botanical Garden

Scientific classification
- Kingdom: Plantae
- Clade: Tracheophytes
- Clade: Angiosperms
- Clade: Eudicots
- Clade: Asterids
- Order: Aquifoliales
- Family: Aquifoliaceae
- Genus: Ilex
- Species: I. asprella

Binomial name
- Ilex asprella (Hook. & Arn.) Champ. ex Benth.

= Ilex asprella =

Species of holly

Ilex asprella, also known as rough-leaved holly and plum-leaved holly, is a deciduous shrub native in South East Asia. Ilex asprella is one of the few deciduous species in the family Aquifoliaceae.

== Morphology ==
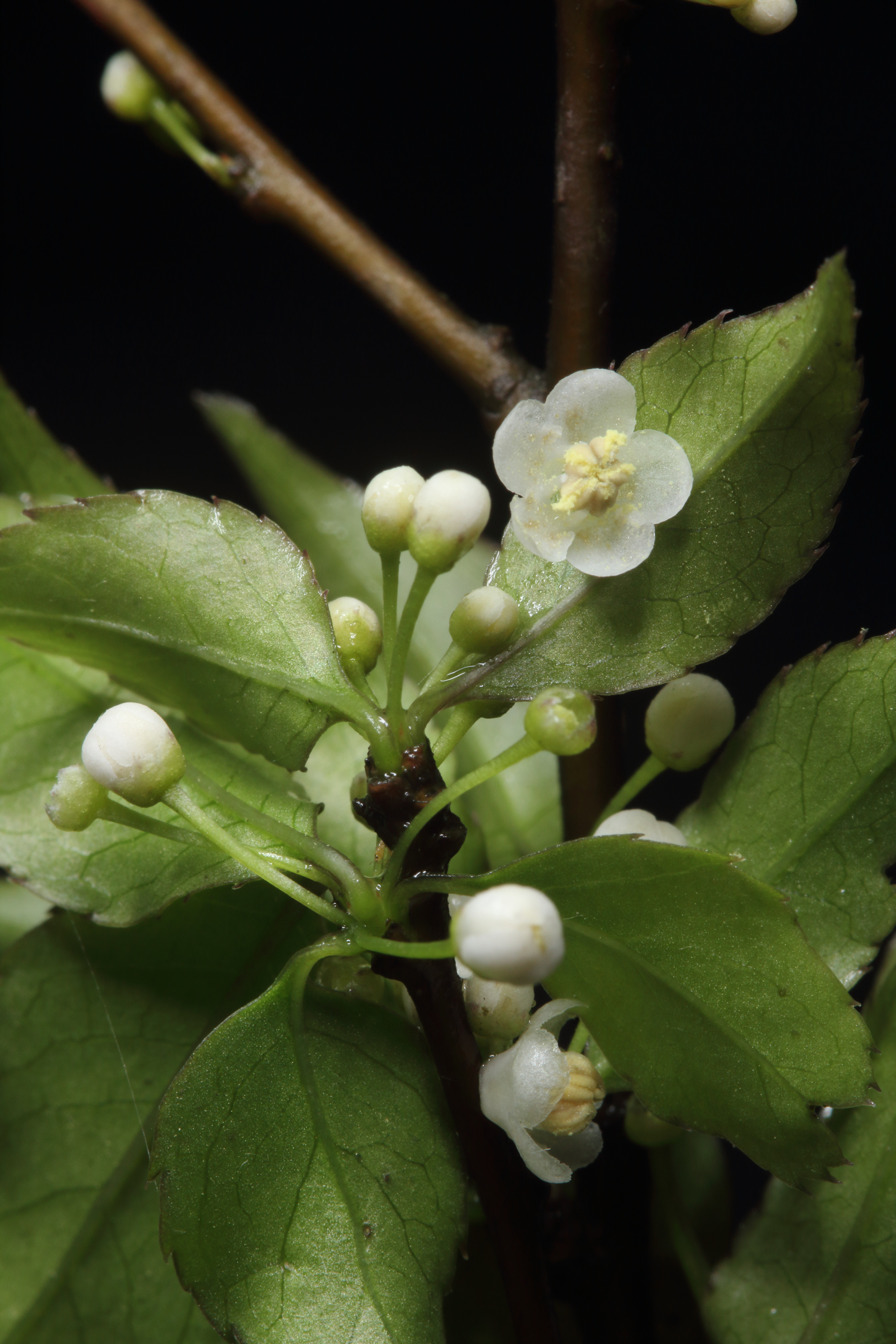
I.asprella male flower

Ilex asprella is a densely branched deciduous shrub that grows up to 3 m tall. The long shoots are glabrous, brown, and slender, while the short shoots are green with significant white lenticels. The leaves are thin-chartaceous, glandular-punctate on the back, ovate, measuring 4 to 5 cm in length and 1.5 to 2.5 cm broad. The leaf apex is acuminate, the base cuneate, the margin serrulate, hirsute on adaxial nerves and nearly glabrous beneath. Petioles are 3 to 8 mm long. The leaves have Reticulate veins with 6 to 8 pairs of pinnate lateral veins.

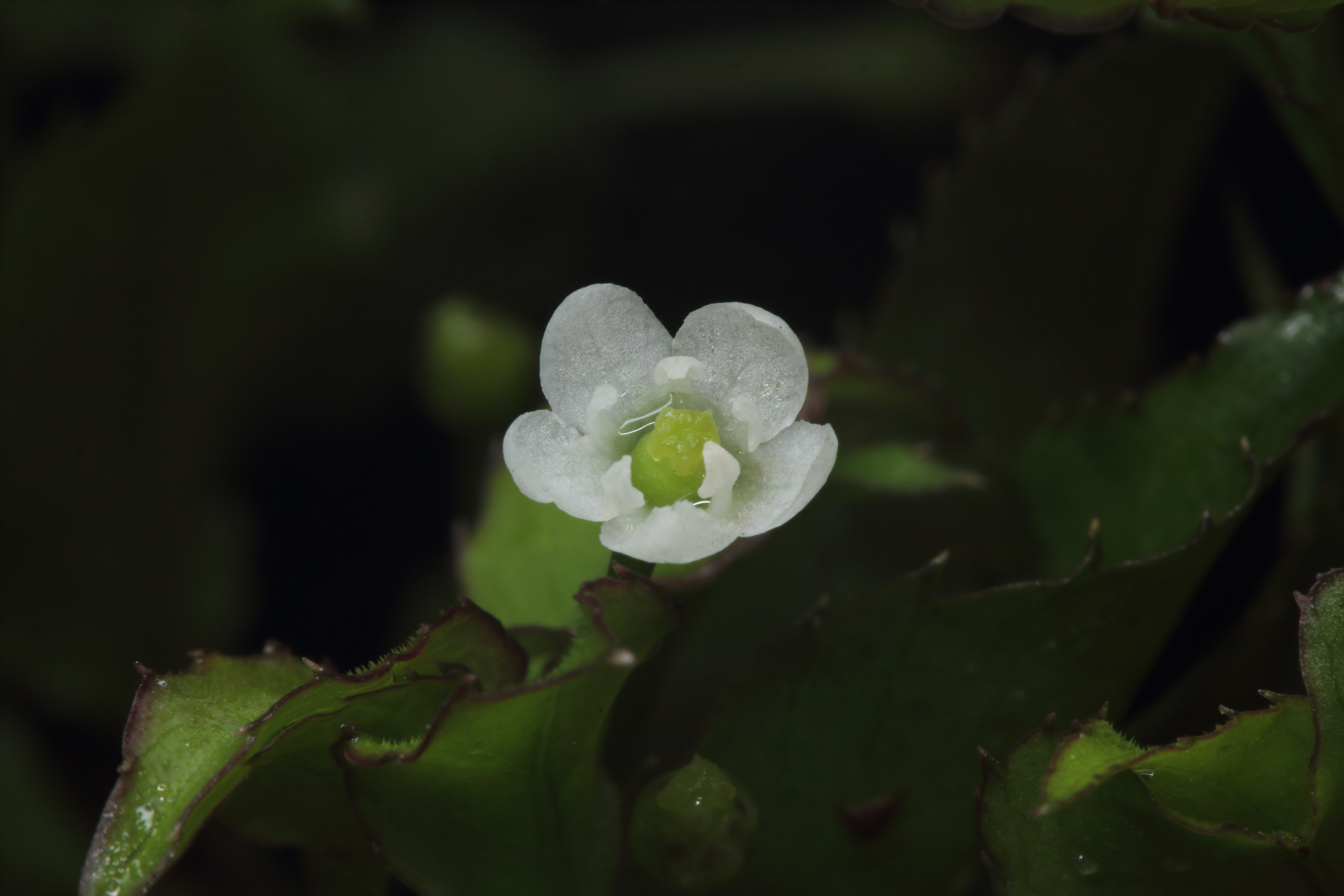
I.asprella female flower

Flowers are white and arranged in axillary umbels with slender pedicels, dioecy. Male flower: 2 to 5 flowers each inflorescence and measure approximately 2.5 to 3 mm in diameter. They are glabrous with 4 or 5 suborbicular petals, margin erose, corolla rotate, base slightly connate; stamens ca. 3/4 as long as petals, anthers oblong and ca. 1 mm. Female flower: 4 to 6 flowers each inflorescence, glabrous, ca. 3 mm in diameter; flowers 4-6; calyx deeply 4 to 6 lobed; corolla rotate, petals suborbicular, basal slightly connate; staminodes ca. 1 mm, sterile anthers sagittate; ovary ovoid, ca. 1.5 mm in diameter, style present, stigma thickly discoid.

Drupe black and globose, endocarp stony, 5 mm long, 4 mm across, pedicel 2 to 3 cm long.

== Distribution ==
Ilex asprella is adapted to tropic climate and humus-rich soil. It can be found in low altitude about 400 to 1000 m in Luzon, S. E. China, and Taiwan in the thickest.

== Usage ==
It is used as a traditional Chinese medicine for multiple effects. The root is dug out during winter and dried in daylight. It is either cooked and consumed as soup or smashed and applied on the skin.
