= MRC (file format) =

mrc
- Filename extension: .mrc
- Type of format: 3D electron density file or 2D image file
- Website: http://www.ccpem.ac.uk/mrc_format/mrc2014.php

MRC is a file format that has become an industry standard in cryo-electron microscopy (cryoEM) and electron tomography (ET), where the result of the technique is a three-dimensional grid of voxels each with a value corresponding to electron density or electric potential. It was developed by the MRC (Medical Research Council, UK) Laboratory of Molecular Biology. In 2014, the format was standardised. The format specification is available on the CCP-EM website.

The MRC format is supported by many of the software packages listed in b:Software Tools For Molecular Microscopy.

== See also ==
- CCP4 (file format)
