= Tipson–Cohen reaction =

Reacrion discovered by Stuart Tipson and Alex Cohen

The Tipson–Cohen reaction is a name reaction first discovered by Stuart Tipson and Alex Cohen at the National Bureau of Standards in Washington D.C. The Tipson–Cohen reaction occurs when two neighboring secondary sulfonyloxy groups in a sugar molecule are treated with zinc dust (Zn) and sodium iodide (NaI) in a refluxing solvent such as N,N-dimethylformamide (DMF) to give an unsaturated carbohydrate.

== Background ==
Unsaturated carbohydrates are desired as they are versatile building blocks that can be used in a variety of reactions. For example, they can be used as intermediates in the synthesis of natural products, or as dienophiles in the Diels-Alder reaction, or as precursors in the synthesis of oligosaccharides. The Tipson–Cohen reaction goes through a syn or anti elimination mechanism to produce an alkene in high to moderate yields. The reaction depends on the neighboring substituents. A mechanism for glucopyranosides and mannooyranosides is shown below.

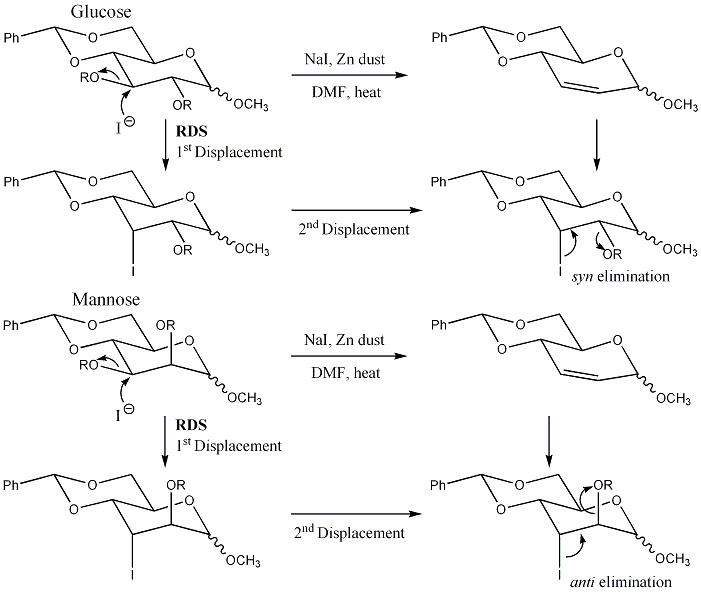

Scheme 1: Syn elimination occurs with the glucopyranosides. Galactopyranosides follows a similar syn mechanism. Whereas, anti elimination occurs with mannopyranosides. Note that R could be a methanesulfonyl CH_{2}O_{2}S (Ms), or a toluenesulfonyl CH_{3}C_{6}H_{4}O_{2}S (Ts).

== Reaction mechanism ==
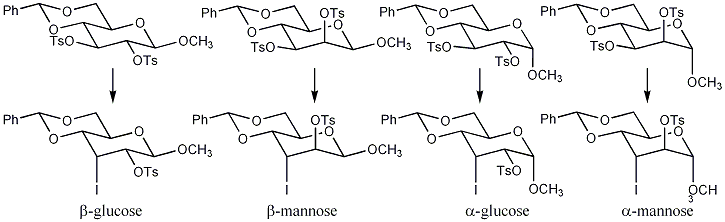

Scheme 3: The scheme illustrates the first displacement, the rate determining step and slowest step, where the starting material is converted to the iodo-intermediate. The intermediate is not detectable as it is rapidly converted to the unsaturated sugar. Experiments with azide instead of the iodide confirmed attack occurs at the C-3 as nitrogen-intermediates were isolated. The order of reactivity from most reactive to least reactive is: β-glucopyranosides > β-mannopyranosides > α-glucopyranosides> α-mannopyranosides.

The reaction of β–mannopyranosides gives low yields and required longer reaction times than with β-glucopyranosides due to the presence of a neighboring axial substituent (sulfonyloxy) relative to C-3 sulfonyloxy group in the starting material. The axial substituent increases the steric interactions in the transition state, causing unfavorable eclipsing of the two sulfonyloxy groups. α-Glucopyranosides possess a β-trans-axial substituent relative to C-3 sulfonyloxy (anomeric OCH_{3} group) in the starting material. The β-trans-axial substituent influences the transition state by also causing an unfavorable steric interaction between the two groups. In the case of α-mannopyranosides, both a neighboring axial substituent (2-sulfonyloxy group) and a β-trans-axial substituent (anomeric OCH_{3} group) are present, therefore significantly increasing the reaction time and decreasing the yield.

== Reaction conditions ==
Table 1: Reaction times and yield vary on the substrate. The β-glucopyranoside was found to be the best substrate for the Tipson–Cohen reaction as the reaction time and yield were much superior that any other substrate proposed in the study.

Substrate^{a}	Time (hours)	Yield (%)
β-glucopyranoside	0.5	85
β-mannopyranoside	2.5	66
α-glucopyranoside	12	55
α-mannopyranoside	15	10

^{a}Substrates possess benzylidene protecting groups at C-4 and C-6, OMe groups at anomeric position and OTs groups at C-2 and C-3. Reaction temperature 95–100 ˚C

== Reaction scope ==
- The reaction has been attempted in the microwave, improving yields with the α-glucopyranoside to 88% and reducing the reaction time significantly to 14 minutes.
- The original paper by Tipson and Cohen also used acyclic sugars to illustrate the utility of the reaction. Thus the reaction is not limited to cyclic carbohydrate derivatives.
- Sulphonoxy groups such as methanesulfonyl and toluenesulfonyl were both used, however it was found that substrates with toluenesulfonyl groups gave higher yields and lower reaction times.
