= Collaborative Computational Project Number 4 =

CCP4
- Developer: CCLRC Daresbury Laboratory
- Stable release: 9.0.014 / 26 February 2026; 48 days ago
- Written in: C, Fortran, Tcl, Python
- Operating system: UNIX, Linux, Mac, MS-Windows
- Type: X-Ray Crystallography
- Website: www.ccp4.ac.uk

The Collaborative Computational Project Number 4 in Protein Crystallography (CCP4) was set up in 1979 in the United Kingdom to support collaboration between researchers working in software development and assemble a comprehensive collection of software for structural biology. The CCP4 core team is located at the Research Complex at Harwell (RCaH) at Rutherford Appleton Laboratory (RAL) in Didcot, near Oxford, UK.

CCP4 was originally supported by the UK Science and Engineering Research Council (SERC), and is now supported by the Biotechnology and Biological Sciences Research Council (BBSRC). The project is coordinated at CCLRC Daresbury Laboratory. The results of this effort gave rise to the CCP4 program suite, which is now distributed to academic and commercial users worldwide.

== Projects ==
- CCP4i – CCP4 Graphical User Interface
- CCP4MG – CCP4 Molecular Graphics Project
- Coot – Graphical Model Building
- HAPPy – automated experimental phasing
- MrBUMP – automated Molecular Replacement
- PISA – Protein Interfaces, Surfaces and Assemblies
- MOSFLM GUI – building a modern interface to MOSFLM

== See also ==
- CCP4 (file format)
