= Gerard Kleywegt =

Dutch X-ray crystallographer

- Born: Gerrit Jacob Kleijwegt; 1962 (age 63–64); Rozenburg, Nederland
- Education: University of Utrecht
- Scientific career
- Fields: Structural biology
- Workplaces: European Bioinformatics Institute; University of Upsala
- Thesis: Computer-assisted assignment of 2D and 3D NMR spectra of proteins (Computer-ondersteunde toekenning van 2D en 3D NMR spectra van eiwitten) (1991)
- Website: http://www.ebi.ac.uk/about/people/gerard-kleywegt

Gerard Jacob Kleywegt (born 5 June 1962, in Rozenburg) is a Dutch X-ray crystallographer and the former team leader of the Protein Data Bank in Europe at the EBI; a member of the Worldwide Protein Data Bank.

== Education ==
Kleywegt obtained his PhD from the University of Utrecht in 1991.

== Career ==
After his PhD, Kleywegt did postdoctoral research with Alwyn Jones at Uppsala University. before moving to the EBI.

== Research ==
Kleywegt's research focuses on protein crystallography and the Protein Data Bank.
