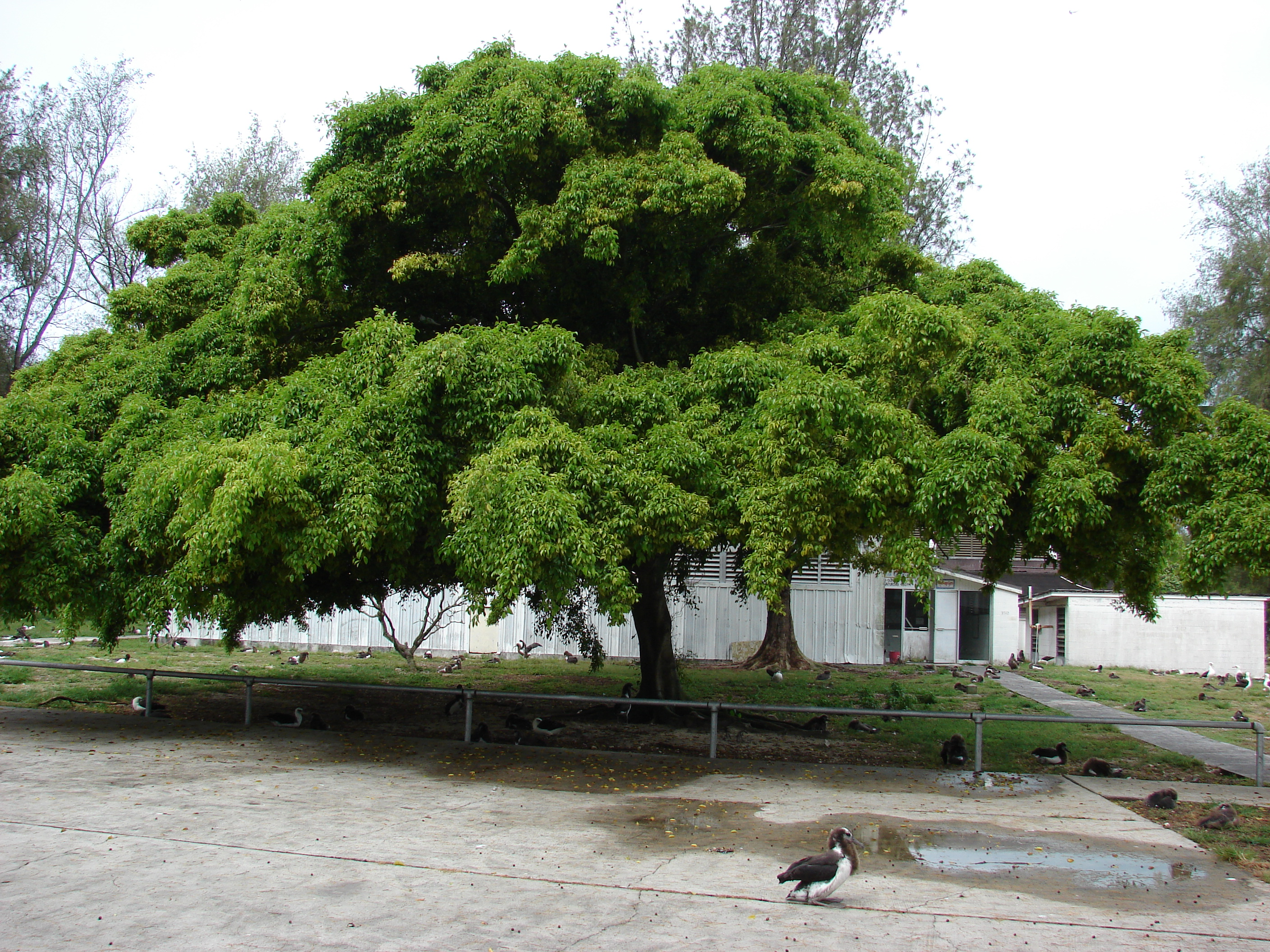

Conservation status
- Least Concern (IUCN 3.1)

Scientific classification
- Kingdom: Plantae
- Clade: Tracheophytes
- Clade: Angiosperms
- Clade: Eudicots
- Clade: Rosids
- Order: Rosales
- Family: Moraceae
- Tribe: Ficeae
- Genus: Ficus
- Subgenus: F. subg. Urostigma
- Species: F. benjamina

Binomial name
- Ficus benjamina L. 1767
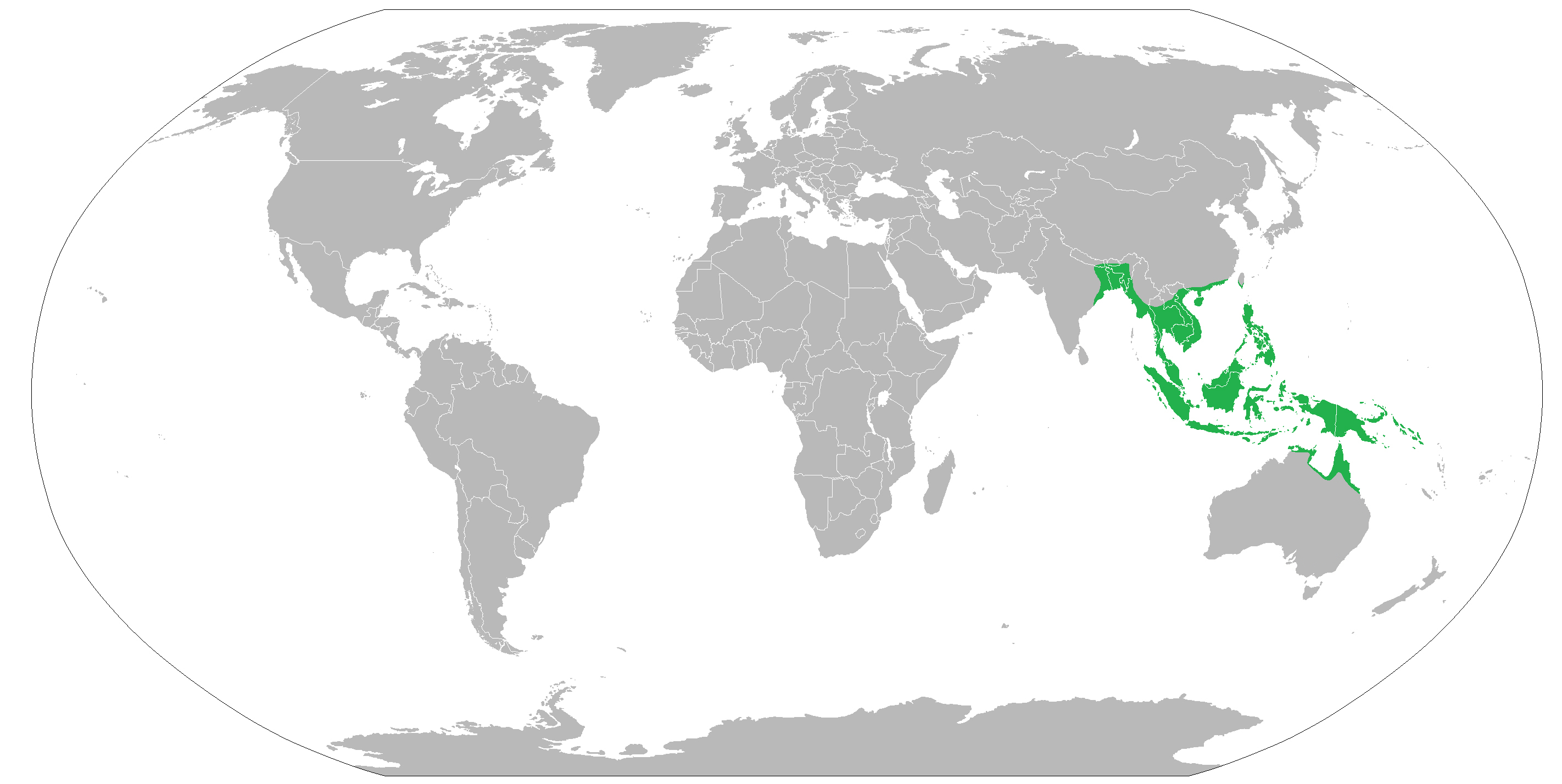
- Range of the species Ficus benjamina.

Synonyms
- Synonymy: Ficus benjamina var. bracteata Corner; Ficus benjamina var comosa (Roxb.) Kurz; Ficus benjamina subsp. comosa (Roxb.) Panigrahi & Murti; Ficus benjamina var. comosa King; Ficus benjamina var. haematocarpa (Blume ex Decne.) Miq.; Ficus benjamina var. nuda (Miq.) M.F.Barrett; Ficus benjamina f. warringiana M.F.Barrett; Ficus comosa Roxb.; Ficus cuspidatocaudata Hayata; Ficus dictyophylla Wall. [Invalid]; Ficus haematocarpa Blume ex Decne.; Ficus lucida Aiton; Ficus neglecta Decne.; Ficus nepalensis Blanco; Ficus nitida Thunb.; Ficus notobor Buch.-Ham. ex Wall. [Invalid]; Ficus nuda (Miq.) Miq.; Ficus papyrifera Griff.; Ficus parvifolia Oken; Ficus pendula Link; Ficus pyrifolia Salisb. [Illegitimate]; Ficus reclinata Desf.; Ficus retusa var. nitida (Thunb.) Miq.; Ficus striata Roth; Ficus umbrina Elmer; Ficus xavieri Merr.; Urostigma benjaminum var. nudum Miq.; Urostigma neglectum Miq. Unresolved; Urostigma nudum Miq.

= Ficus benjamina =

Species of fig

Ficus benjamina, commonly known as weeping fig, benjamin fig or ficus tree and often sold in stores as just ficus, is a species of flowering plant in the family Moraceae, native to Asia and Australia. It is the official tree of Bangkok. The species is also naturalized in the West Indies and in the states of Florida and Arizona in the United States. Its small fruit are favored by some birds. Ficus trees have proved to have environmental benefits in urban areas, such as acting as biomonitors. The species is also associated with some allergens.

== Description ==
Ficus benjamina is a tree reaching 30 m (98 feet) tall in natural conditions, with gracefully drooping branchlets and glossy leaves 6–13 cm (2 3/8–5 1/8 inches), oval with an acuminate tip. The bark is light gray and smooth. The bark of young branches is brownish. The widely spread, highly branching tree top often covers a diameter of 10 metres (33 ft). It is a relatively small-leaved fig. The changeable leaves are simple, entire and stalked. The petiole is 1 to 2.5 cm (3/8 to 1 inch) long. The young foliage is light green and slightly wavy, the older leaves are green and smooth; the leaf blade is ovate to ovate-lanceolate with wedge-shaped to broadly rounded base and ends with a short dropper tip. The pale glossy to dull leaf blade is 5 to 12 cm (2 to 4 1/2 inches) cm long and 2 to 6 cm (1 to 2 1/2 inches) wide. Near the leaf margins are yellow crystal cells ("cystolites"). The two membranous, deciduous stipules are not fused, lanceolate and 6 to 12 mm (1/4 to 1/2 inch) (rarely to 15 mm or 9/16 inch) long.

F. benjamina is monoecious. The inflorescences are spherical to egg-shaped, shiny green, and have a diameter of 1.5 cm (1/2 inch). In the inflorescences are three types of flowers: male and fertile and sterile female flowers. The scattered, inflorescences, stalked, male flowers have free sepals and a stamen. Many fertile female flowers are sessile and have three or four sepals and an egg-shaped ovary. The more or less lateral style ends in an enlarged scar. Pollination of F. benjamina only occurs with a specific type of wasp that live symbiotically together.

The ripe figs (collective fruit) are orange-red and have a diameter of 2.0 to 2.5 cm (3/4 to 1 inch).

F. benjamina is capable of high soil carbon sequestration.

== Cultivation ==
In tropical, subtropical and warm temperate latitudes, the weeping fig makes a very large and stately tree for parks and other urban situations, such as wide roads. It is often cultivated for this purpose, such as in Bourbong Street Weeping Figs in Bundaberg, where it is heritage listed.

F. benjamina is a very popular houseplant in temperate areas because of its elegant growth and tolerance of poor growing conditions; it does best in bright, sunny conditions, but it also tolerates considerable shade. It requires a moderate amount of watering in summer and only enough to keep it from drying out in the winter. Longer days, rather high daytime and moderate night-time temperatures constitute favorable conditions for appreciable growth in a short time. It does not need to be misted. The plant is sensitive to cold and should be protected from strong drafts. When grown indoors, it can grow too large for its location and may need drastic pruning or replacement. F. benjamina has been shown effectively to remove gaseous formaldehyde from indoor air. F. benjamina also helps eliminate heavy metals, most commonly in urban areas. The plant has been used as a biomonitor in New Mexico.

Figs tend to be consumed dried. The fruit is edible, but the species is not usually grown for its fruit. The leaves have been known to have pharmaceutical benefits such as anti-oxidant properties. The leaves are very sensitive to small changes in light. When a tree is turned around or relocated, it reacts by dropping many of its leaves and replacing them with new leaves adapted to the new light intensity. The plant is also sensitive to changes in other environmental factors such as temperature, humidity and relocation (citation needed).

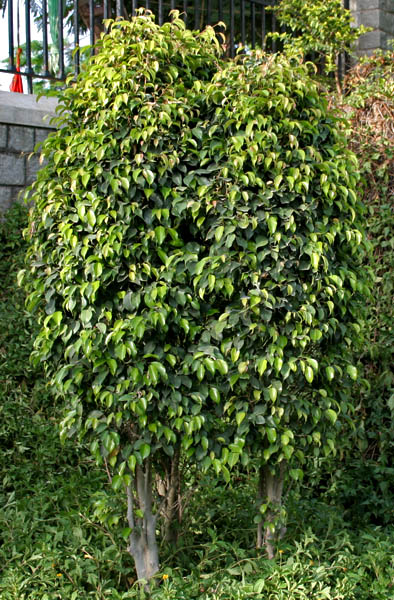
Used as decorative plant in gardens in Hyderabad, India

=== Cultivars ===
Numerous cultivars are available (e.g. 'Danielle', 'Naomi', 'Exotica', and 'Golden King'). Some cultivars include different patterns of colouration on the leaves, ranging from light green to dark green, and various forms of white variegation. In cultivation in the UK, this plant and the variegated cultivar 'Starlight' have earned the Royal Horticultural Society's Award of Garden Merit. Miniature cultivars, especially 'Too Little', are among the most popular plants for indoor bonsai.

== Destructive roots and hurricane propensity ==
The United States Forest Service states, "Roots grow rapidly, invading gardens, growing under and lifting sidewalks, patios, and driveways." They conclude that its use in tree form is too large for residential planting, therefore, the species should only be used as a hedge or clipped screen.

These trees are also considered a high risk for succumbing to storm gale winds in hurricane-prone South Florida. As a consequence, in many jurisdictions in South Florida, no permit is needed for removal of these trees. The South Florida Water District recommends removing them safely and promptly.

== Allergic reactions ==
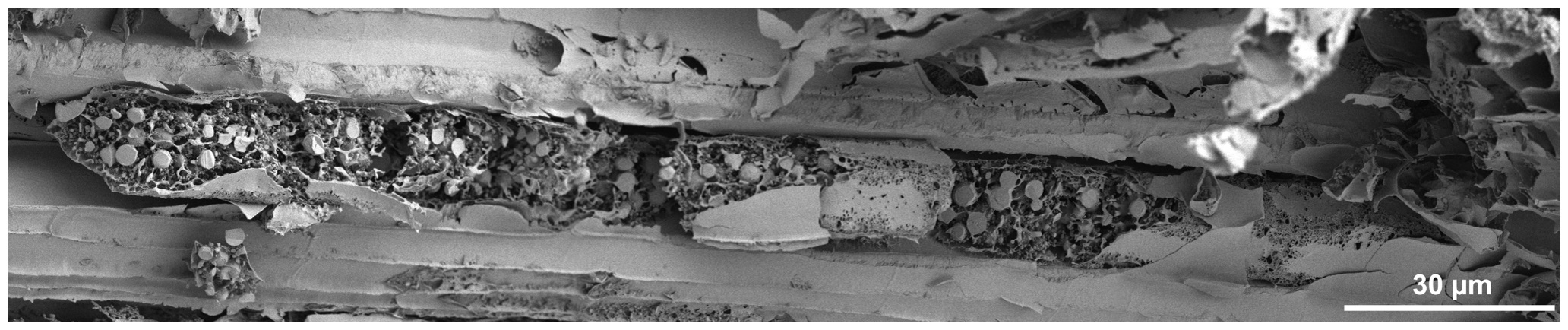
Lactifer inside shoot axis of Ficus benjamina showing latex particles. Image using cryo-SEM.

The plant is a major source of indoor allergens, ranking as the third-most common cause of indoor allergies after dust and pets. Common allergy symptoms include rhinoconjunctivitis and allergic asthma. Ficus plants can be of particular concern to latex allergy sufferers because of the latex in the plants and should not be kept in the environment of those allergic to latex. In extreme cases, Ficus sap exposure can cause anaphylactic shock in latex allergy sufferers. The consumption of many parts of the plant can lead to nausea, vomiting, and diarrhea; safe exceptions are the edible fruits.

Allergy to Ficus plants develops over time and from exposure. The allergy was first observed in occupational settings amongst workers who regularly handled the plants. A study of workers at four plant-leasing firms showed that 27% of the workers had developed antibodies in response to exposure to the plants.

== Gallery ==
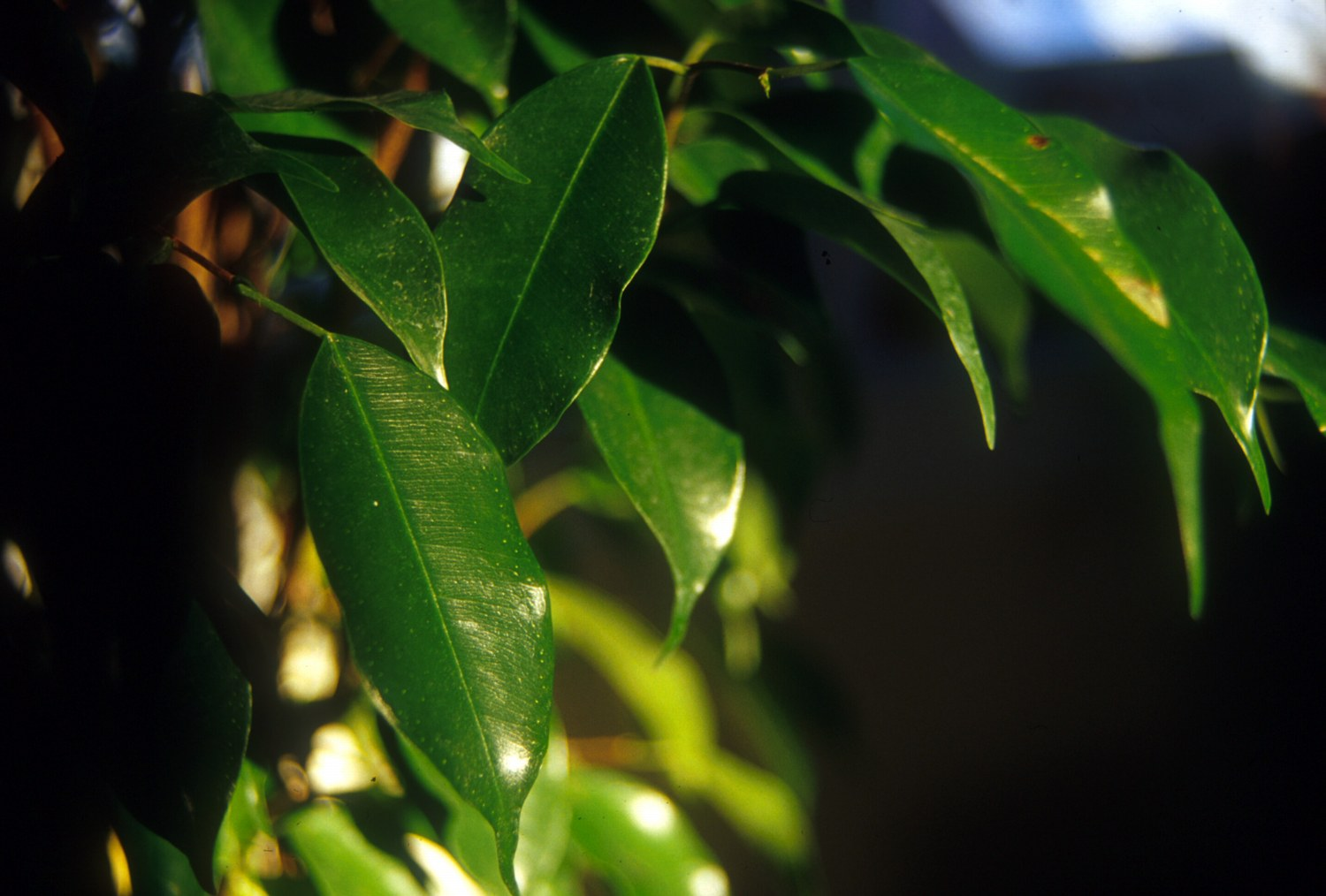
Foliage

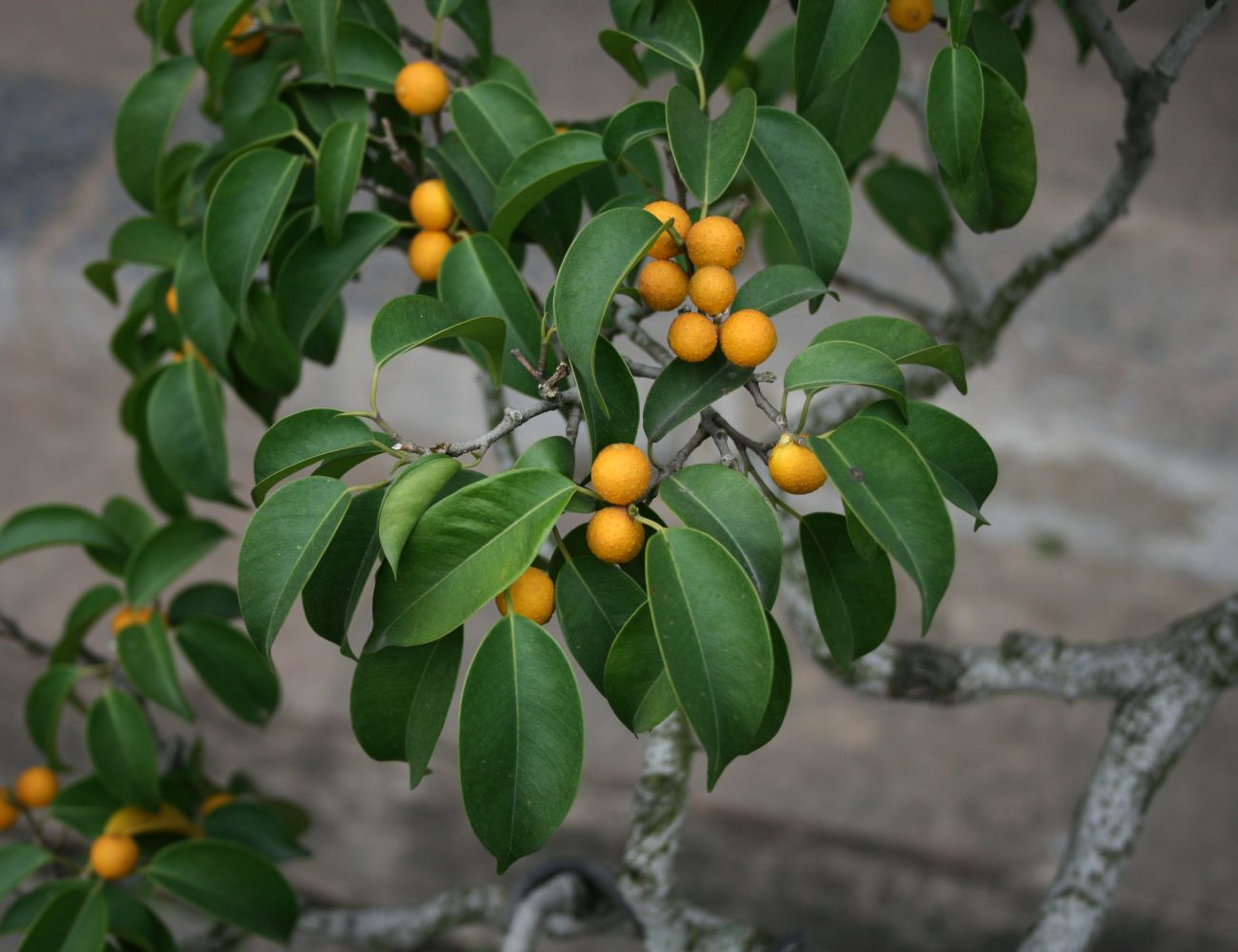
Fruits

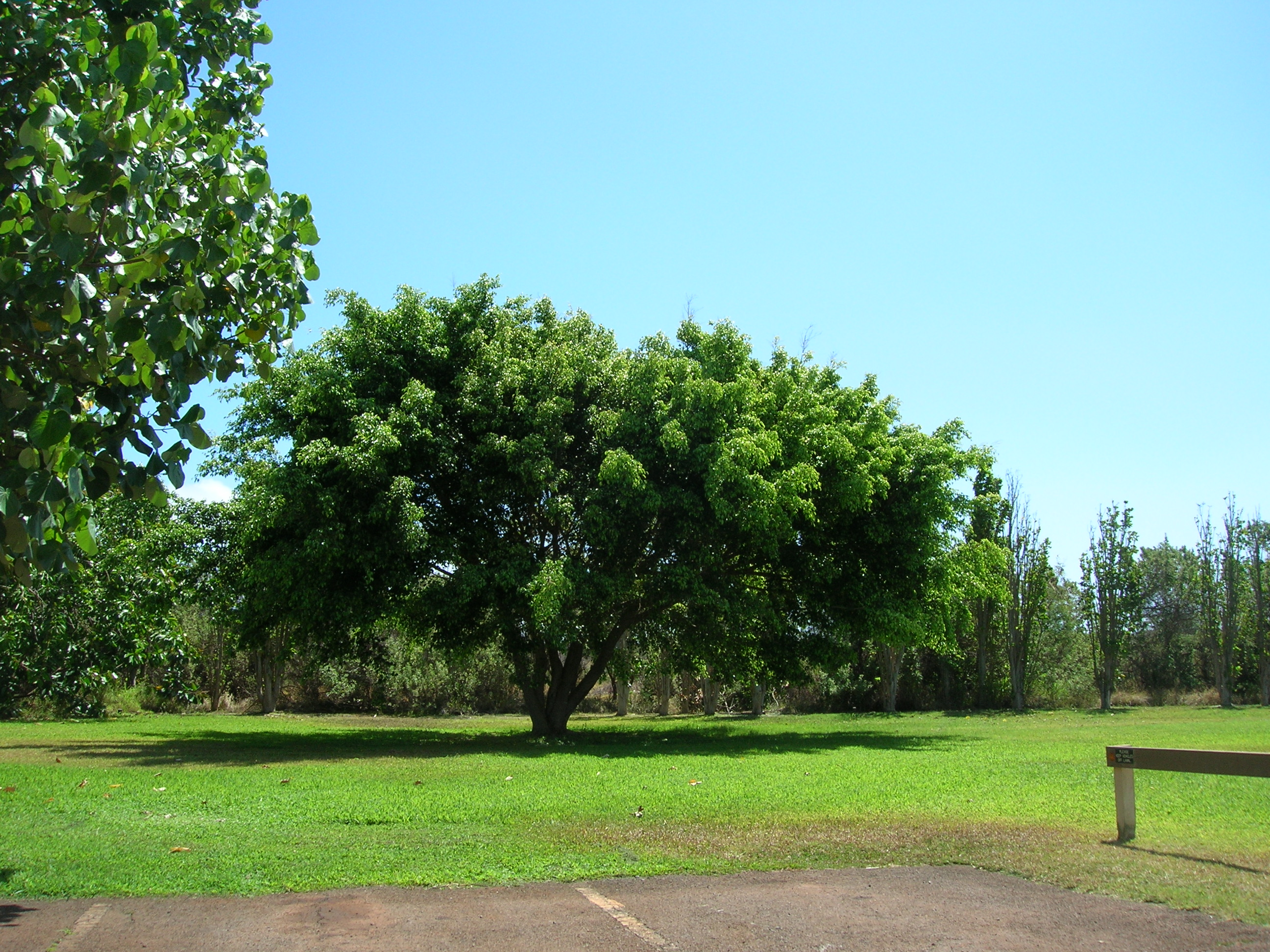
Tree in Hawaii

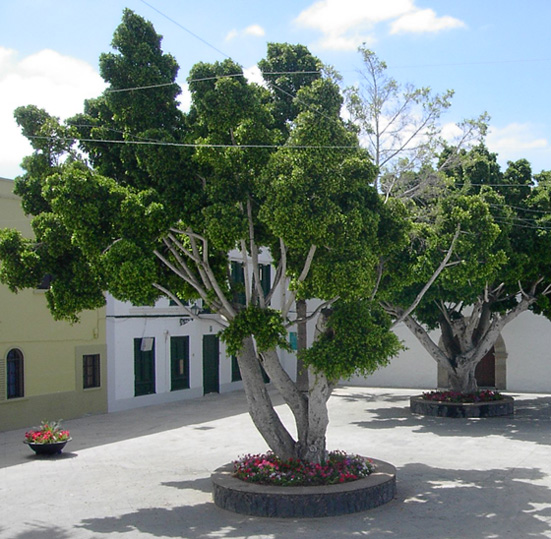
Tree in Tenerife

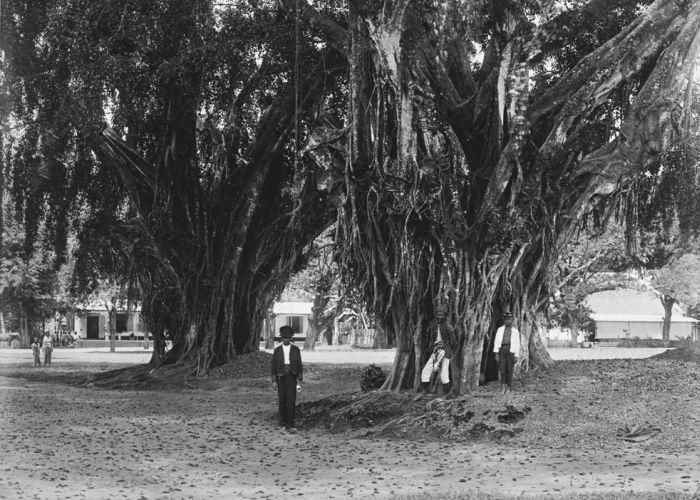
Tree in the alun-alun (city square) of Lumajang, East Java. The iconic tree toppled in January 2021

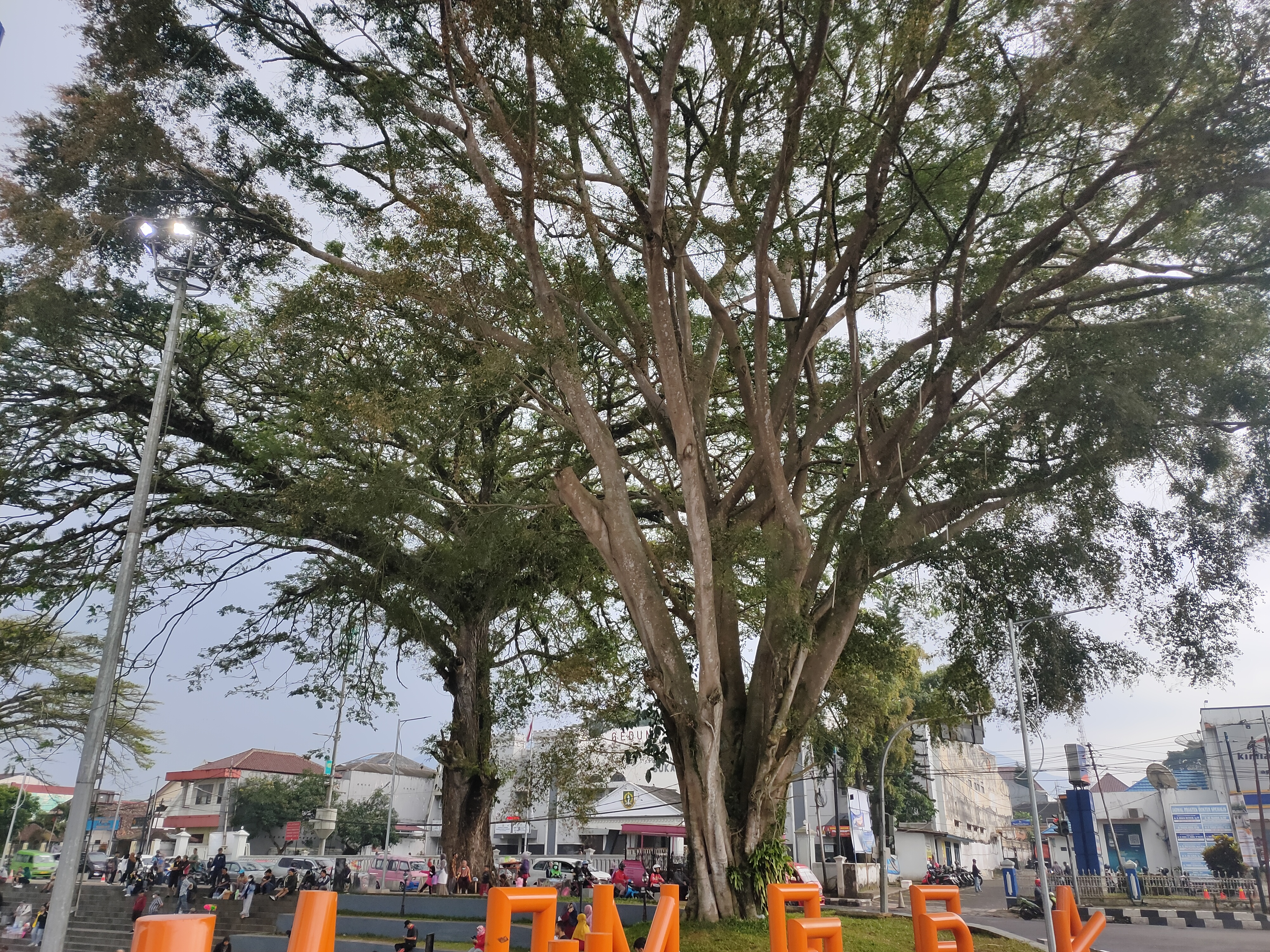
Tree in West Java

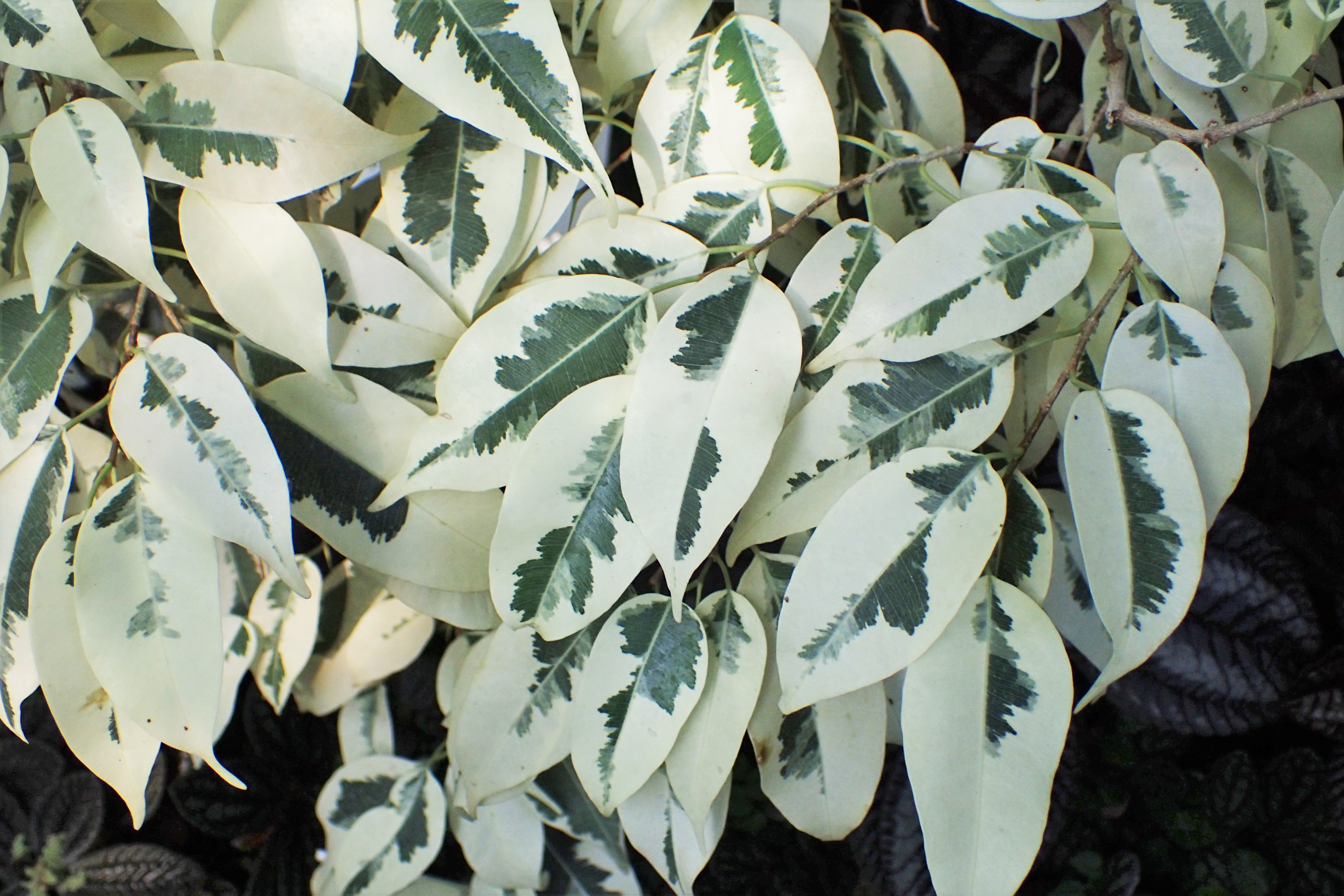
Ficus benjamina 'Starlight' in the Botanic Garden of the Jagiellonian University in Kraków, Poland

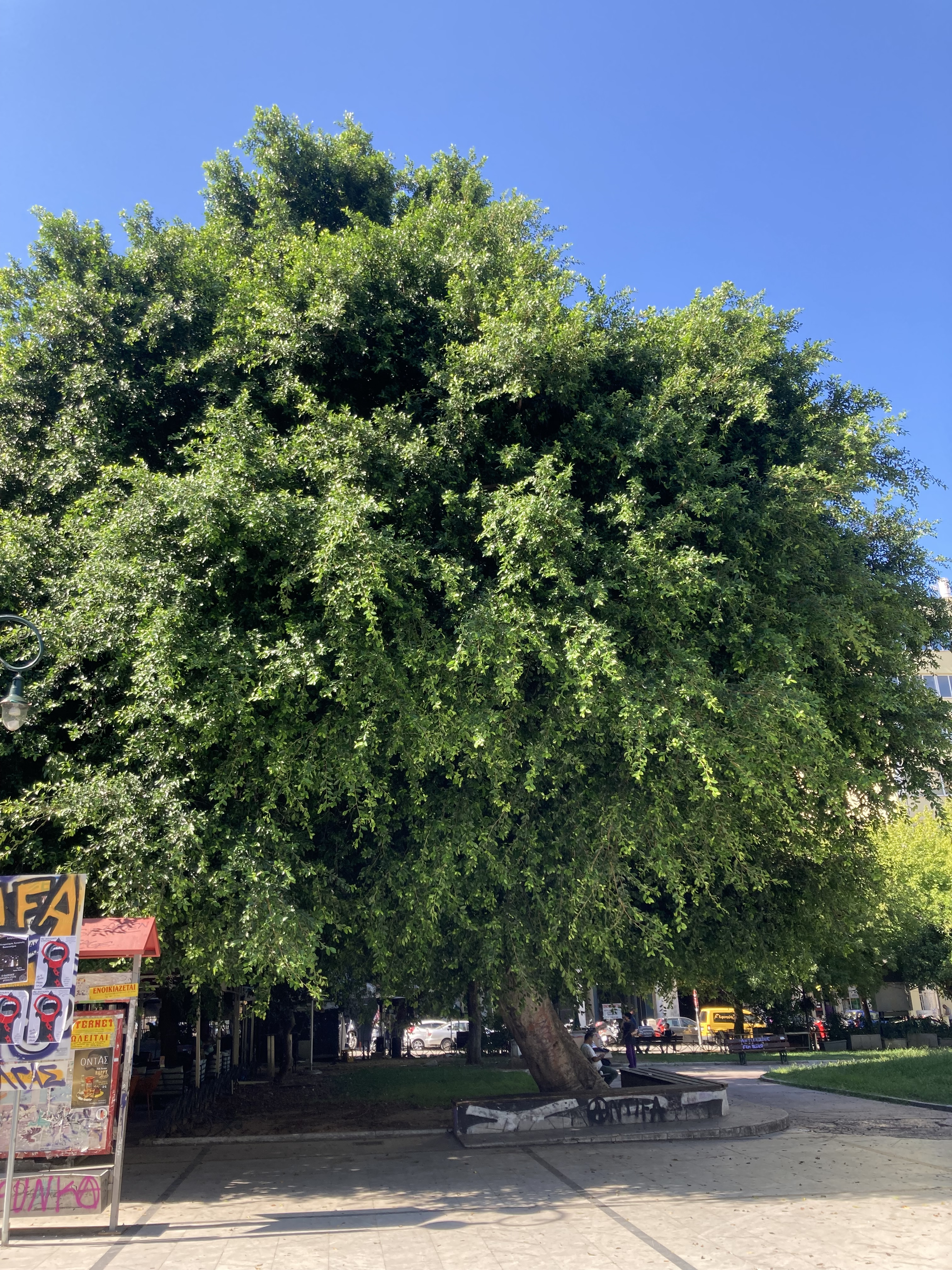
Ficus benjamina in Patras, Greece

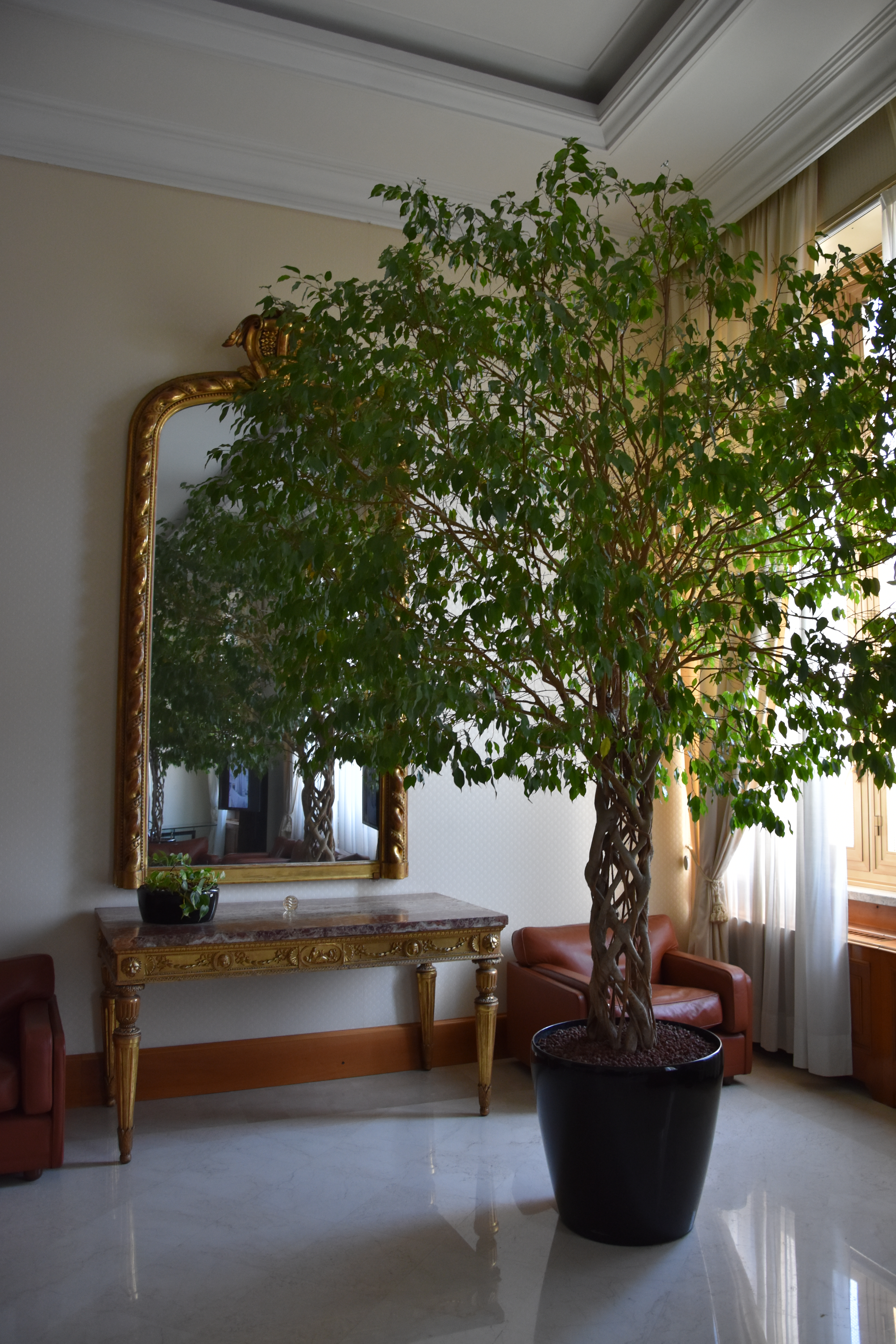
Ficus benjamina in the Bank of Italy building in Milan, Italy
