= Cryofixation =

Specimen preparation process

Cryofixation is a technique for fixation or stabilisation of biological materials as the first step in specimen preparation for the electron microscopy and cryo-electron microscopy. Typical specimens for cryofixation include small samples of plant or animal tissue, cell suspensions of microorganisms or cultured cells, suspensions of viruses or virus capsids and samples of purified macromolecules, especially proteins.

Types of cryo-fixation are freezing-drying, freezing-substitution and freezing-etching.

== Plunge freezing ==
The method involves ultra-rapid cooling of small tissue or cell samples to the temperature of liquid nitrogen (−196 °C) or below, stopping all motion and metabolic activity and preserving the internal structure by freezing all fluid phases solid. Typically, a sample is plunged into liquid nitrogen or into liquid ethane or liquid propane in a container cooled by liquid nitrogen. The ultimate objective is to freeze the specimen so rapidly (at 10^{4} to 10^{6} K per second) that ice crystals are unable to form, or are prevented from growing big enough to cause damage to the specimen's ultrastructure. The formation of samples containing specimens in amorphous ice is the "holy grail" of biological cryomicroscopy.

In practice, it is very difficult to achieve high enough cooling rates to produce amorphous ice in specimens more than a few micrometres in thickness. For this purpose, plunging a specimen into liquid nitrogen at its boiling point (−196 °C) does not always freeze the specimen fast enough, for several reasons. First, the liquid nitrogen boils rapidly around the specimen forming a film of insulating N_{2} gas that slows heat transfer to the cryogenic liquid, known as the Leidenfrost effect. Cooling rates can be improved by pumping the liquid nitrogen with a rotary vane vacuum pump for a few tens of seconds before plunging the specimen into it. This lowers the temperature of the liquid nitrogen below its boiling point, so that when the specimen is plunged into it, it envelops the specimen closely for a brief period of time and extracts heat from it more efficiently. Even faster cooling can be obtained by plunging specimens into liquid propane or ethane (ethane has been found to be more efficient) cooled very close to their melting points using liquid nitrogen or by slamming the specimen against highly polished liquid nitrogen-cooled metal surfaces made of copper or silver. Secondly, two properties of water itself prevent rapid cryofixation in large specimens. The thermal conductivity of ice is very low compared with that of metals, and water releases of latent heat of fusion as it freezes, defeating rapid cooldown in specimens more than a few micrometres thick.

== High-pressure freezing ==
High pressure helps prevent the formation of large ice crystals. Self pressurized rapid freezing (SPRF) can utilize many different cryogens has recently been touted as an attractive and low cost alternative to high pressure freezing (HPF). Cold pressurized nitrogen substitutes ethanol at temperatures roughly 123K. The warm ethanol is then expelled by the freezing LN2 and most likely produces an ethanol-nitrogen mixture that gradually becomes colder and colder.

== Freeze-drying ==
Drying times are reduced by up to 30% with proper freeze drying.

== See also ==
- Cryopreservation
