= Virus crystallisation =

Re-arrangement of viral components into solid crystal particles

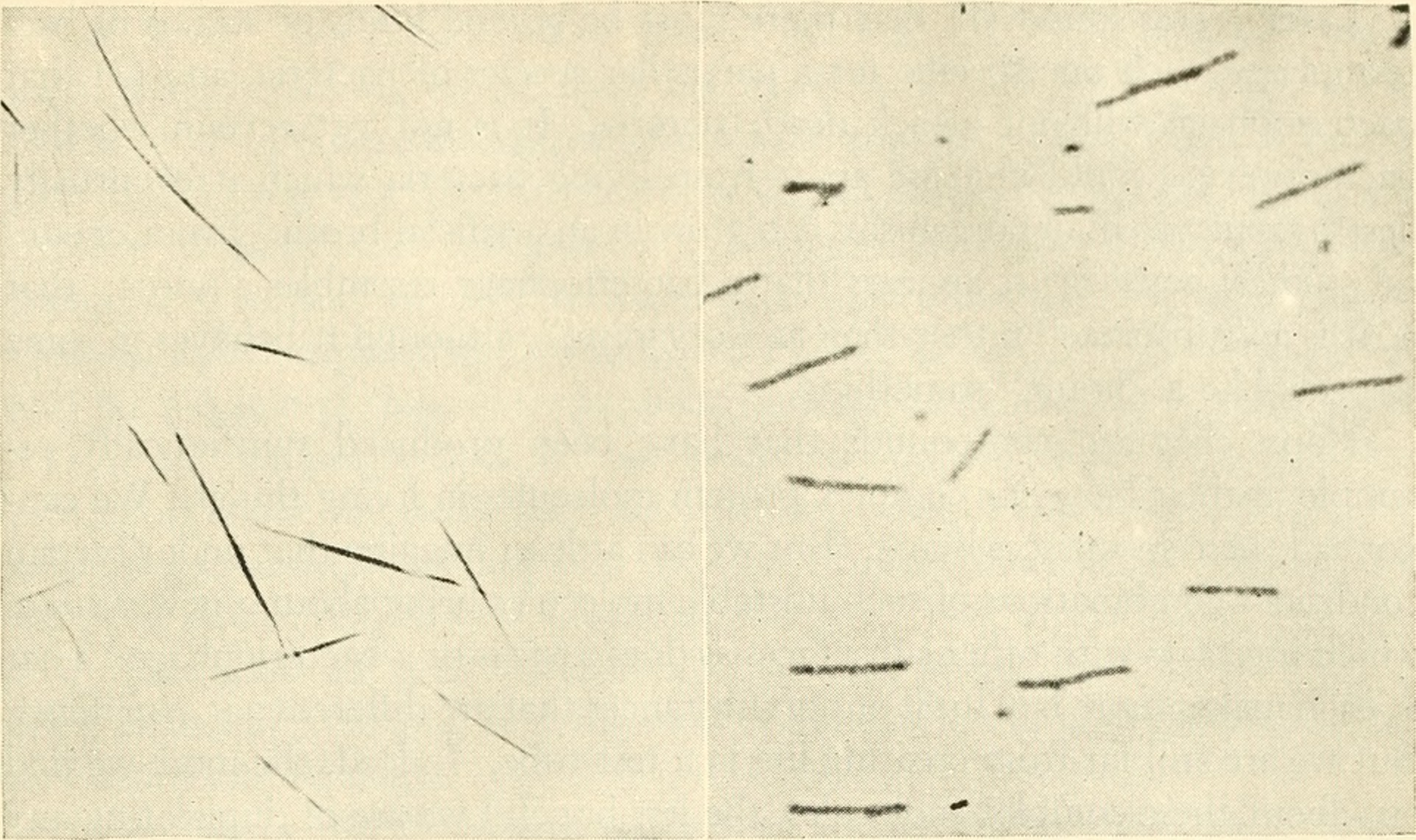
Comparison between crystallisation of salt (left) and Tobacco Mosaic virus (right) as seen through electron microscopy.

Virus crystallisation is the re-arrangement of viral components into solid crystal particles. The crystals are composed of thousands of inactive forms of a particular virus arranged in the shape of a prism. The inactive nature of virus crystals provide advantages for immunologists to effectively analyze the structure and function behind viruses. Understanding of such characteristics have been enhanced thanks to the enhancement and diversity in crystallisation technologies. Virus crystals have a deep history of being widely applied in epidemiology and virology, and still to this day remains a catalyst for studying viral patterns to mitigate potential disease outbreaks.

== Historical background ==
=== Pre-20th century ===
Virus crystals originate back to the late 19th century where the first protein crystallisation discoveries were made by German biologists Ritthausen and Osborne, mainly for hemoglobin in worms and fishes. These early observations were primarily regarded as laboratory curiosities. What began as mere curiosities evolved into the need for purification and isolation of proteins for clearer visualisation, thus leading to protein crystallisation. Protein crystallisation techniques were ultimately introduced in virology after the rise of the Tobacco Mosaic Viruses (TMV), which were the first ever viruses to be discovered.

=== 1930s ===
Achieving clear visualisation of viruses using limited technology, such as microscopy was difficult due to their relatively miniature size, with the smallest of viruses measuring in at roughly 20 nm in diameter. Microscopy was therefore a relatively challenging field, with alternative methods of observation in high demand. TMV viruses were first crystallised by Wendell Stanley, who demonstrated that TMV viruses retained its infectivity even in crystal form. It was during this time when researchers discovered that crystallised viruses (much like proteins and other organic molecules) could diffract X-rays, implying a complex structural mechanism in viral bodies. This breakthrough served as the basis for the expansion of virology into X-ray crystallography.

=== 1950s, 1960s ===
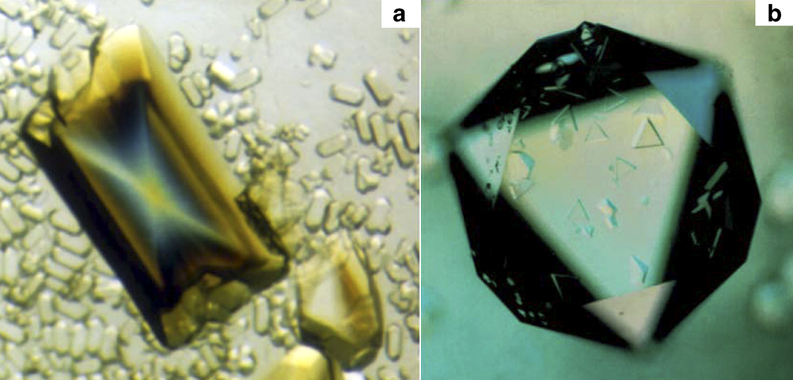
Crystals of the Satellite Tobacco Mosaic Virus (STMV) with different geometries allow for different perspectives of visualisation. Both orthorhombic crystals (left) and cubic crystals (right) come in equivalent sizes.

X-ray crystallography was developed during the mid 20th century by scientists' efforts to study the characteristics of crystallised viruses in laboratory investigations. Amongst them was Dorothy Hodgkin, an expert in molecular microbiology, who determined TMV structure through virus crystals that could diffract X-ray. This discovery served as a basis to continuous refinement in methods of virus crystallography, which later led to the determination of numerous other virus structures, including the poliovirus, rhinovirus, and Human retrovirus (HIV). Such advancements provided valuable insights into the mechanisms of viral infection and replication, thus facilitating the development of antiviral drugs and vaccines heading into the late 20th century.

=== 1990s–Today ===
It was towards the end of the 20th century when scientists realized viruses surrounded with thick lipid membranes were unable to form ordered crystals. Such viruses made it difficult to properly obtain X-ray diffraction results. In response to this, cryogenic electron microscopy (cryo-EM) emerged as a new, alternative method for studying virus structures. Cryo-EM enables scientists to visualise viruses at near-atomic resolution without crystallisation. Combination of both X-ray crystallography and cryo-EM have contributed towards the field of virus morphology and behaviour in the immune system. Such advancements in technology have not only shed light on viral characteristics, but has revolutionized virology as a whole, and continue to be subject to heavy focus to this day.

== Viral structure and behaviour ==
Viruses are defined as "obligate intracellular parasites" that contain DNA or RNA in the viral genome core, and are encased by a protective protein coat. Generally, the core is encased in capsid proteins in a single or double-layered structure. Some viruses, such as some Coronaviruses, also develop a large lipid membrane known as the envelope when found in particular hosts. This membrane is composed of a lipid bilayer surrounding a layer of membrane-bound proteins, with either surface glycoproteins or spike proteins protruding from the extracellular aspect. Such viral envelope is usually acquired when travelling through the plasma or intracellular matrices of the host organism and may vary in composition depending on the host cell's membrane lipid content and host cell proteins. The structure of note for crystallisation and identification is the capsid protein structure. Viruses are majorly icosahedral in structure, with the second most common organisation being a helical, spring-like, structure. Viral capsid structures are organised in such a way as to maximise the efficiency of carrying its specific length of RNA or DNA chain. The kinetics of the capsid proteins may also play a role in its organisation, though this has not yet been fully elucidated. The symmetry and geometry of viruses is facilitated by the crystallisation of viruses (and more specifically their capsid protein subunits) in order to study protein-protein interactions; a proxy for the capsids' properties and functions.

=== Helical capsid structure ===
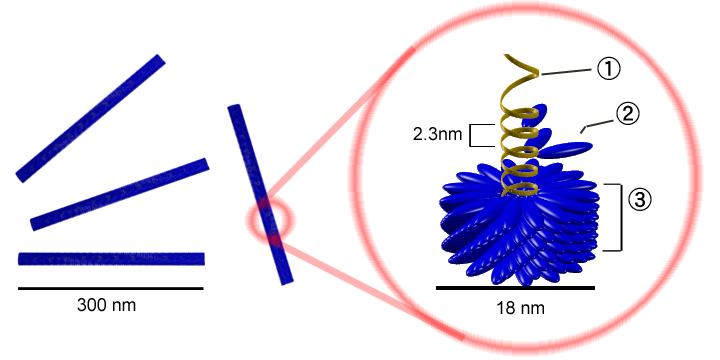
Schematic model showing the helical capsid structure of the Tobacco Mosaic virus (TMV).

The helical capsid structure is majorly dependent on the length of the viral RNA or DNA genome. Due to the nature of packing identical asymmetric proteins with no rotational symmetry in order to minimise disturbance to protein-protein bonds at specific binding and receptor sites, capsid protein structures composed of a repetition of identical protein subunits necessarily arranges itself into a lattice that folds to encase its contents in a helical structure, much like the naturally occurring helical structure seen in DNA. This resultant helical structure is the case due to the geometric limitations and symmetrical nature necessitated by the protein sub-assembly array and its protein-protein interactions. The Tobacco Mosaic Virus studied by Caspar and Klug in their 1962 crystallisation study was discovered to be composed of a '2 to 5 capsid protein subunit aggregate', arranged in a helical capsid structure.

=== Icosahedral capsid structure ===
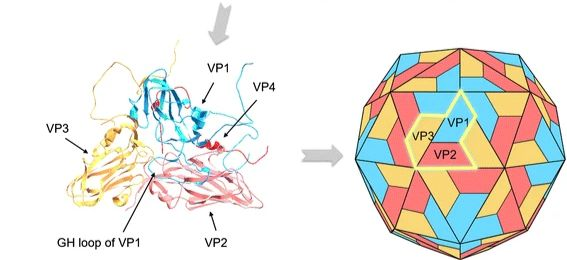
(Left) Ribbon diagram showing the asymmetrical capsid structural aggregate of the Foot-and-mouth disease virus (FMDV), a repeating subunit that makes up its spherical capsid structure. (Right) Image of the 3D icosahedral symmetry of the capsid. Protein chains VP1, VP2, VP3, and VP4 individually derive from smaller structural protein components of the capsid.

The Icosahedral capsid structure is majorly dependent on the energy efficiency and geometric limitations of the packaging of the genome. Similar to the constraints that lend to the symmetrical nature of the helical capsid structure, specific geometric limitations naturally and necessarily apply on the possible conformations of the encasing structure. The icosahedral capsid structure is the most common arrangement due to 2-3-5 symmetry of its namesake shape, allowing for the use of up to the greatest number (60 units) of triangular "identical symmetrical units" to construct a 'spherical' shell to enclose some given material at any given size. In terms of optimising the ratio of number of required protein sub-assemblies and the surface area enclosed, icosahedral symmetry is again found to be the smallest and most efficient symmetry to adopt. Icosahedral capsid structure is an optimal design for encasing material due to its geometric and symmetric properties, lending to its efficient design being naturally and necessarily adopted by a majority of viral lineages. The symmetrical and highly-order nature of most virus crystals can be attributed to the inherent symmetry of the icosahedral capsid structure and its protein-protein interactions.

=== Viral behaviour ===
Viruses generally invade and hijack host cells as a method of replication. Once infected, the host cell has its cellular processes compromised as virally encoded proteins are produced from virus replication and propagation. This process consists of Protein-protein interactions of the primary and tertiary structure of the capsid, and is subject to heavy focus for better understanding of the molecular and biochemical mechanisms of viral behaviour.

== Crystallisation procedure ==
The aim of crystallisation is to grow suitable sized, high quality virus crystals in order to be read properly during the imaging process. Artificial crystallisation in the laboratory is generally carried out in four major steps:

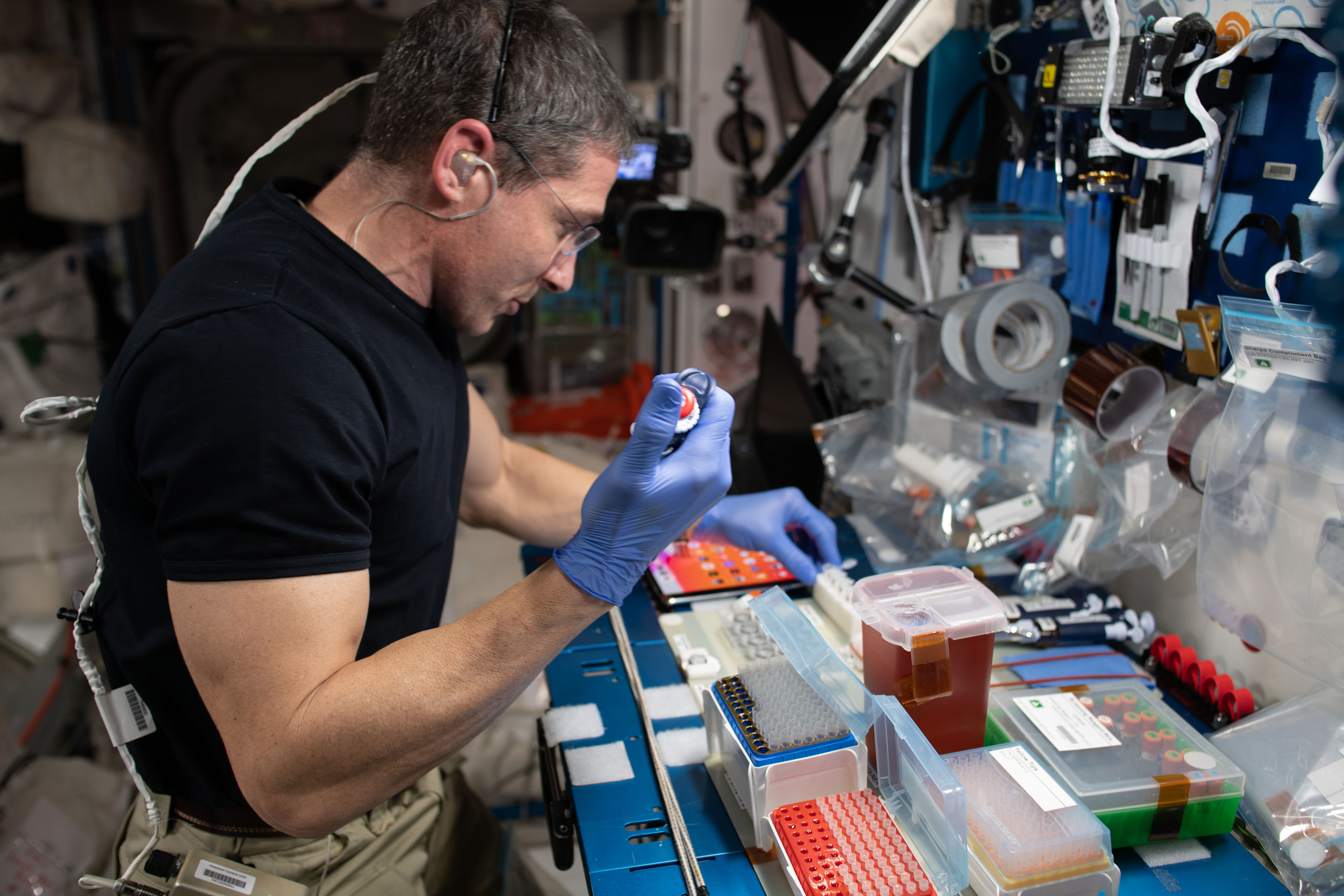
NASA engineer Michael Hopkins loading protein crystallography plates with prepared protein solutions for the Phase II Real-time Protein Crystal Growth experiment

1. Propagation

Viruses of specific species are placed in incubators with healthy cells, which mimics their ideal conditions for proper functioning. With the presence of healthy cells, viruses attach and undergo replication to produce large samples.

2. Extraction and purification (isolation)

The replicated virus particles are extracted, which is followed by purification to remove unwanted substances such as debris. This process isolates virus particles and leaves them in high concentration solutions. They then undergo centrifugalizing, which separates the liquid supernatant from the solid virus precipitate. This process is repeated until the precipitate is further densified into a virus pellet.

3. Nucleation

Concentrated virus pellets are treated with reagents that allow them to form small crystal nuclei. Such stages are referred to as nucleation, a critical process during the early stages of crystallisations, where small clusters of coat proteins aggregate to form the building blocks of the outer capsid structure. Some coat proteins are charged and produce electrostatic repulsion, which needs to be overcome by hydrophobic interactions in order to crystallise the capsid. Hydrophobic interactions refer to the tendency of nonpolar regions of molecules that associate with each other strongly in aqueous environments, but minimize contact with water.

4. Crystal growth

Virus crystals are typically grown in vitro once initial crystal nuclei are formed. The growth of virus crystals can be influenced by various factors such as temperature, pH, and the presence of specific additives or precipitants in the solution. When successful, viral particles align and associate with each other in a regular pattern forming repeating three dimensional lattices. The growth process can take hours to days, depending on the virus and the crystallisation conditions.

== Imaging techniques ==
Crystalline structures of virus crystals undergo imaging to produce visual results. They are developed to obtain information on microscopic arrangements in immobilized virus particles. Imaging has improved over time as advancements in X-ray sources, detectors and computer based imaging programs enhanced feasibility in procedures such as X-ray crystallography and cryogenic electron microscopy.

=== X-ray crystallography ===
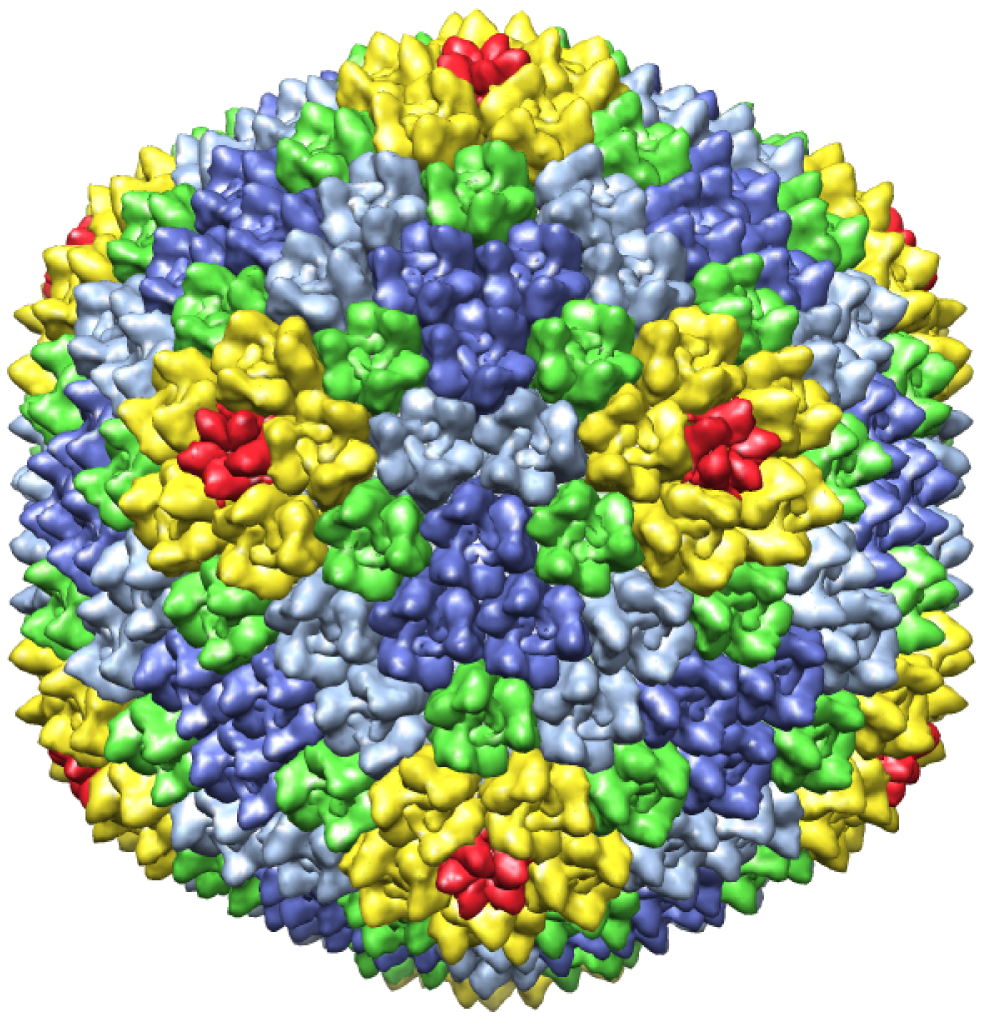
Shown here is the X-ray crystallography determined structure of a virion of Enterobacteria phage PRD1, a type of tectivirus from the genus Alphatectivirus in 2-fold symmetry view. Virus crystals amplify weak signals from the scattering of diffracted X-rays by individual atoms and virus particles. Precise atomic positions and arrangement of capsid proteins are generated under high resolution.

X-ray crystallography utilizes virus crystals' ability to diffract electromagnetic waves upon exposure. Diffraction in this case refers to the interference of scattered waves emitted in different directions across the lattice. Diffraction patterns depend on internal order within the crystal. High internal order with dense arrangements produce more extensive diffraction patterns with higher resolution, allowing for more precise determination of atomic positions. An X-ray diffractometer is used to measure the crystal's ability to diffract waves upon being exposed to the X-ray source.

X-ray crystallography does not guarantee accurate performance for all virus crystals. For example, virus crystals at macromolecular size have significant limitations compared to smaller crystals. They are softer and are more susceptible to damage, and can easily disintegrate over high radiation. This results from the significant amount of liquid between molecules, with approximately 50% solvent content on average. The solvent consists of water and other small molecules that freely diffuse through the crystal's interstitial spaces. Such unwanted presence of solvent-filled channels within macromolecular crystals hinder the reading of X-ray diffraction patterns.

=== Cryogenic electron microscopy (Cryo-EM) ===
Cryogenic electron microscopy (Cryo-EM) utilizes the kinetics of a beam of electrons to detect and image a sample. Cryo-EM provides an overall improved performance over the traditional light microscope due to its higher resolution and magnification.

In cryo-EM, crystallisation is not necessary and can directly observe biological samples, such as infected host cells and active viruses. This provides significant advantages over X-ray crystallography when investigating complex viral structures that pose challenges during crystallisation. It is particularly useful in observing the conformational changes of the virus, which is difficult to achieve via crystallisation.

However, despite Cryo-EM being able to provide higher resolution over light microscopes, it is not enough to exceed that of X-ray crystallography. X-ray crystallography still remain as the most suitable approach when taking into account atomic level structures and micro-molecular interactions. Researchers therefore combine both cryo-EM and X-ray crystallisation as a method of overcoming each other's limitations.

=== Advances in imaging technology ===
Five major stages are involved in a typical cryo-EM experiment: sample preparation, grid preparation, data collection, image processing, and structure determination. The reconstruction of a 3D density map is derived upon its 2D model, which allows for clearer visualisation of the structure for the sake of better understanding of its morphology.

Recent advancements in cryo-electron microscopy (cryo-EM) have expanded the extent in which virus morphology could be uncovered by researchers. Cryo-EM began to feature direct electron detectors (DEDs), which involve direct conversion of ejected electrons into electrical signals, thus improving the speed and feasibility of the imaging procedure. Limitations with studying large molecular complexes were combated with the introduction of cryo-electron tomography (cryo-ET) . This is an alternative to cryo-EM that allows for visualisation of the environment and interaction outside of the virus inhabited host cell. Such advancements have propelled the understanding of virus activity in its host cell environment, rather than solely focusing on the virus itself.

Advancements in X-ray crystallography under the name of macromolecular crystallography (MX) have also been involved in the image technology overhaul phase. MX is considered a new scientific discipline that adapts advanced tools and automated procedures. This is carried out with synchrotron sources, fast detectors, and innovative sample delivery methods to study the dynamic features of macromolecules. Such technique that observes virus dynamics rather than its static composition is referred to as time resolved crystallography.

Time resolved crystallography is facilitated through X-ray Free Electron Lasers (XFELs), which is a new generation of light sources succeeding the traditional notion of synchrotron radiation, as it allows for more control over light power and range. Despite the rapid evolution cryo-EM that does not require crystallisation, MX and XFELs allow virus crystallisation to remain relevant and continue to play a vital role in providing atomic-level details of viruses.

== Undiscovered areas ==
Whether or not viruses are 'alive' is a subject of heavy debate across the world. While viruses exhibit some behaviours that can be characterized as 'alive', such as their ability to replicate and evolve, they lack certain essential features typically associated with life, such as cellular structure and independent metabolism. Overcoming limitations to virus crystallisation can provide important details about unknown molecular interactions that determine their life-like behaviour, thus allowing its characteristics to be comparable with those that belong to a biological kingdom.

== Future prospects ==
With major enhancements being made in X-ray crystallography and cryo-electron microscopy, researchers are shifting their focus back to the growing process of crystals, as they remain as prominent issues by placing limitations on crystal size variability. More emphasis is required on overcoming the limitations to macromolecular crystals, as its demand has been growing amongst researchers. Many viral crystals fall into this category, hence, the traditional crystallisation technique is said to receive more attention heading into the future.
