= Cryo-electron microscopy =

Electron microscopy technique

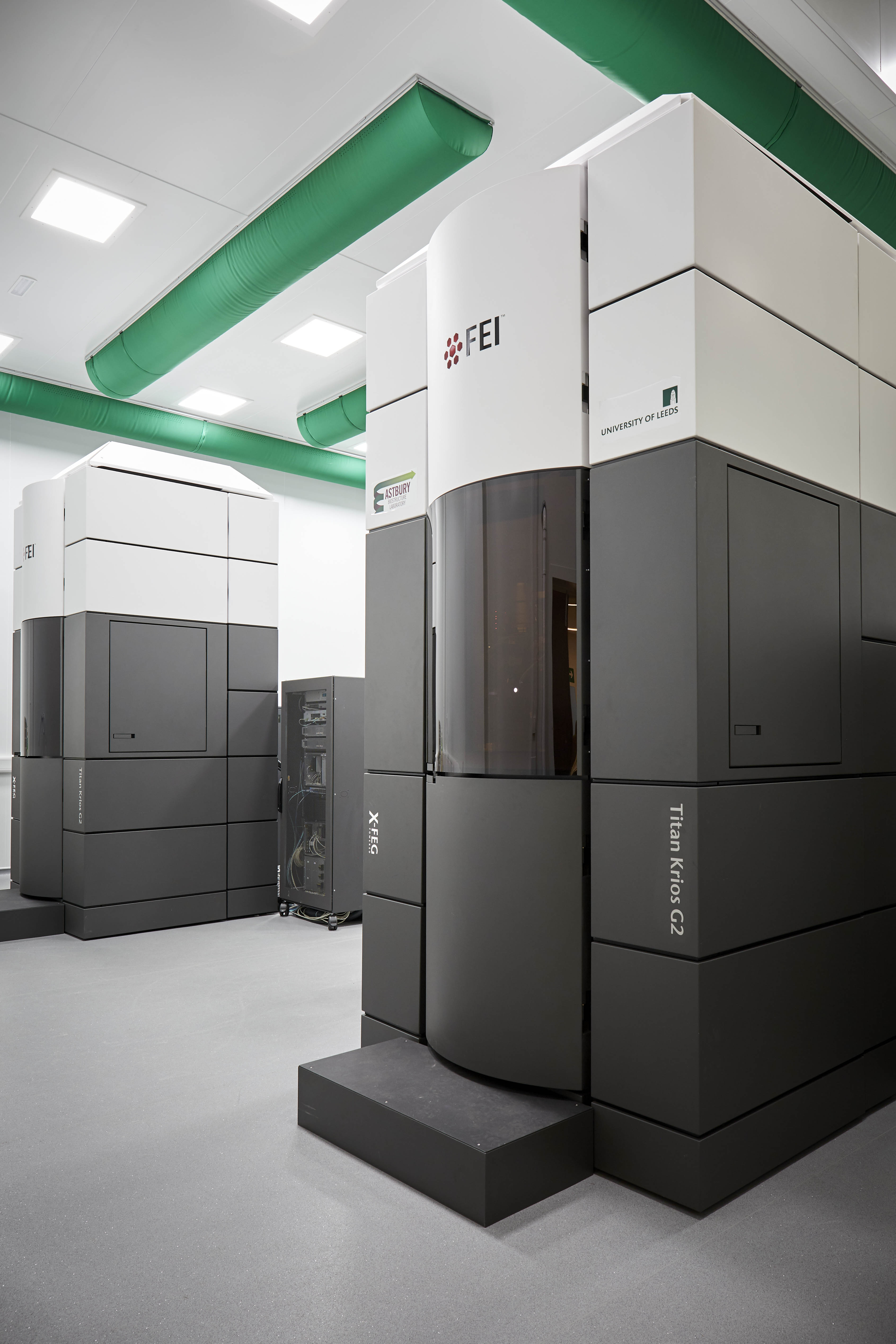
Titan Krios at the University of Leeds

Cryogenic electron microscopy (cryo-EM) is a transmission electron microscopy technique applied to samples cooled to cryogenic temperatures. Developed in the 1970s, advances in detector technology and software allow biomolecular structures to be imaged at near-atomic resolution. The approach has become a popular alternative to X-ray crystallography or nuclear magnetic resonance (NMR) spectroscopy in structural biology.

When scanning a biological specimen, the sample structure is preserved by embedding the specimen in vitreous ice. An aqueous sample solution is applied to a grid mesh and plunge-frozen in either liquid ethane or a mixture of liquid ethane and propane.

The 2017 Nobel Prize in Chemistry was awarded to Jacques Dubochet, Joachim Frank, and Richard Henderson "for developing cryo-electron microscopy for the high-resolution structure determination of biomolecules in solution." Nature Methods also named cryo-EM as the "Method of the Year" in 2015.

== History ==
=== Early development ===
Jacques Dubochet behind a transmission microscope (Philips CM100). University of Lausanne, 2000

In the 1960s, transmission electron microscopy of biological samples was limited because of radiation damage from the high-energy electron beams. Scientists hypothesized that examining specimens at low temperatures would reduce beam-induced radiation damage. Both liquid helium (−269 °C or 4 K or −452 °F) and liquid nitrogen (−195.79 °C or 77 K or −320 °F) were considered as cryogens, though high stability was never achieved. In 1980, Erwin Knapek and Jacques Dubochet published comments on beam damage at cryogenic temperatures sharing observations that:

Thin crystals mounted on carbon film were found to be from 30 to 300 times more beam-resistant at 4 K than at room temperature... Most of our results can be explained by assuming that cryoprotection in the region of 4 K is strongly dependent on the temperature.

However, these results were not reproduced. Amendments were published two years later along with a commentary in Nature, indicating that beam resistance was less significant than anticipated. The protection gained at 4 K was closer to "tenfold for standard samples of L-valine" than what was previously stated. While cryo-EM samples are routinely collected at liquid nitrogen temperatures, work has continued to understand sample behavior at liquid helium temperatures.

In 1981, scientists at the European Molecular Biology Laboratory reported the first successful cryo-EM. Researchers sprayed pure water onto a hydrophilic carbon film that was rapidly plunged into a cryogen (liquid propane or liquid ethane cooled to 77 K). The thin layer of amorphous ice formed on the film was less than 1 μm thick, and an electron diffraction pattern confirmed the presence of amorphous/vitreous ice. In 1984, the group demonstrated the power of cryo-EM in structural biology by analysing vitrified adenovirus type 2, T4 bacteriophage, Semliki Forest virus, Bacteriophage CbK, and vesicular stomatitis virus. The paper marked the origin of cryo-EM, and the technique has since become routine in laboratories throughout the world.

The energy of the electrons used for imaging (80–300 kV) can break covalent bonds in organic and biological samples. Imaging biological specimens requires minimising electron exposure. Low exposures require images of thousands or millions of frozen molecules to be selected, aligned, and averaged to obtain high-resolution maps using specialized software. The 2012 introduction of direct electron detectors and better computational algorithms significantly improved structural features.

=== Recent advancements ===
The 2010s saw drastic advancements in electron cameras, including to direct electron detectors, causing a "resolution revolution" pushing the resolution barrier beneath the crucial ~2-3 Å limit to resolve amino acid position and orientation.

Direct electron detectors and more powerful imaging algorithms allow macromolecular structures to be determined at near-atomic resolution. Imaged macromolecules include viruses, ribosomes, mitochondria, ion channels, and enzyme complexes. Starting in 2018, cryo-EM could be applied to structures as small as hemoglobin (64 kDa) with resolutions up to 1.8 Å. In 2019, cryo-EM structures grew to 2.5% of structures deposited in the Protein Data Bank. Cryo-EM can be used for cryo-electron tomography (cryo-ET), creating 3D reconstructions of samples from tilted 2D images.

Richard Henderson of the MRC Laboratory of Molecular Biology at Cambridge formed a consortium with engineers at the Rutherford Appleton Laboratory and scientists at the Max Planck Society to fund and develop a first prototype. The consortium then joined forces with electron microscope manufacturer FEI to roll out and market the new design. At about the same time, Gatan Inc. of Pleasanton, California, came out with a similar detector designed by Peter Denes of the Lawrence Berkeley National Laboratory and David Agard of the University of California, San Francisco. A third type of camera was developed by Nguyen-Huu Xuong at the Direct Electron company in San Diego.

Recent advancements in protein-based imaging scaffolds assist with sample orientation bias and size limit. Though the minimum size for cryo-EM remains undetermined, proteins smaller than ~50 kDa generally have too low a signal-to-noise ratio (SNR) to resolve protein particles, making 3D reconstruction difficult or impossible. Multiple techniques have been reported to improve SNR when determining the structures of small proteins. Based on high-affinity DARPins, nanobodies, and antibody fragments, these methods rigidly bind the target protein and thereby increase the effective particle size and introduce symmetry to improve SNR for cryo-EM map reconstruction. An advantage of cryo-EM over crystallization is that it requires much less sample material, making it easier to determine the structures of proteins that cannot be isolated with a high yield.

In recognition of the impact cryo-EM has had on biochemistry, Dubochet, Frank and Henderson were awarded the 2017 Nobel Prize in Chemistry "for developing cryo-electron microscopy for the high-resolution structure determination of biomolecules in solution."

== Techniques ==
=== Mode of electron microscopy ===
==== Cryogenic transmission electron microscopy ====
Cryogenic transmission electron microscopy (cryo-TEM) is a variant of transmission electron microscopy, in which samples are cooled to as low as −196 °C (77.1 K) to preserve the native structure of the compound. This enables near-atomic-level analysis of protein structures. Colloquially, the term "cryogenic electron microscopy" or its shortening "cryo-EM" refers to cryogenic transmission electron microscopy by default, as the vast majority of cryo-EM is done in transmission electron microscopes rather than scanning electron microscopes (SEMs).

==== Correlative light cryo-TEM and cryo-ET ====
In 2019, correlative light cryo-TEM and cryo-ET were used to observe tunnelling nanotubes (TNTs) in neuronal cells.

==== Scanning electron cryomicroscopy ====
Scanning electron cryomicroscopy (cryoSEM) is a scanning electron microscopy technique. Samples are frozen using slush nitrogen or liquid ethane, minimizing any damage to the sample caused by ice crystal formation and the Leidenfrost effect and maximizing water retention. Samples are kept in a vacuum or inert gas to prevent rapid crystal formation induced by atmospheric exposure. Samples can be broken at this step and sublimated to enable scanning of internal structures. As frozen samples are nonconductive, samples are typically coated in a thin conductive metal layer to reduce beam damage and improve image resolution. Samples are then placed inside the SEM machine for scanning.

=== Technique of use and data analysis ===
==== Electron cryotomography ====
In electron cryotomography (cryo-ET), many pictures of a sample are taken from different angles using a tilting mechanism. The images are combined to create a 3D model (map) of ~1–4 nm resolution.

==== Single particle analysis ====
Single particle analysis workflow

Single particle analysis (SPA) is the typical method used to obtain near-atomic resolution (<1 nm) models of biomolecules. In SPA, a large collection of cryo-EM images are searched for copies of the target molecule. These copies are sorted into "classes", which are groupings of what the orientation of the particle is. The classes and their particles are then each assigned a relative position to one another in the original molecule. Programs used for this process include RELION or CryoSPARC. The main advantage of SPA compared to standard cryo-ET is the combination of images from similar objects to reach higher resolutions.

When combined with a knowledge of time progression, the result, termed time-resolved cryo-TEM, is used to capture the kinetics of structural changes in biological macromolecules.

===== Comparisons to X-ray crystallography =====
Traditionally, X-ray crystallography has been the most popular technique for determining the 3D structures of biological molecules. However, the aforementioned improvements in cryo-EM have increased its popularity as a tool for examining the details of biological molecules. Since 2010, yearly cryo-EM structure deposits have outpaced X-ray crystallography. Though X-ray crystallography has drastically more total deposits due to a decades-longer history, total cryo-EM deposits are projected to eclipse those of X-ray crystallography around 2035.

The resolution of X-ray crystallography is limited by crystal homogeneity. Coaxing biological molecules with unknown ideal crystallization conditions into a crystalline state can be very time-consuming, in extreme cases taking months or even years. By contrast, sample preparation in cryo-EM may require several rounds of screening and optimization to overcome issues such as protein aggregation and preferred orientations, but does not require the sample to form crystals; rather, samples for cryo-EM are flash-frozen and examined in a near-native state.

According to Proteopedia, the median resolution achieved by X-ray crystallography (as of May 19, 2019) on the Protein Data Bank is 2.05 Å, and the highest resolution achieved on record (as of September 30, 2022) is 0.48 Å. As of 2020, the majority of protein structures determined by SPA are at a lower resolution of 3–4 Å. However, as of 2020, the best cryo-EM resolution has been recorded at 1.22 Å, making it a competitor in resolution to X-ray crystallography in some cases.

==== Electron crystallography ====
Similar to X-ray crystallography using an X-ray diffraction pattern, electrons can also produce a electron diffraction pattern from a crystal. Research in this area has a long history dating back to early work such as the determination of the positions of hydrogen atoms in NH_{4}Cl crystals by W. E. Laschkarew and I. D. Usykin in 1933.

Cryo-EC is typically done with 3D crystals, but it has also been used in the analysis of two-dimensional crystals and helical filaments or tubes.

Microcrystal electron diffraction (MicroED) is a version of electron crystallography that works with crystals a billion times smaller than what X-ray diffraction requires. It has been used to determine the structure of large biomolecules (such as proteins, nucleic acids, and their complexes). It is also very useful in studying small molecules, from peptides to simpler compounds.

== Specimen handling ==
This section does not apply to electron crystallography.

=== Biological specimens ===
==== Thin film ====
The biological material is spread on an electron microscopy grid and preserved in a frozen-hydrated state via rapid freezing, usually in liquid ethane near liquid nitrogen temperature. By maintaining specimens at liquid nitrogen temperature or colder, they can be introduced into the high vacuum of the electron microscope column. Most biological specimens are extremely radiosensitive, so they must be imaged with low-dose techniques (usefully, the low temperature of cryo-TEM provides an additional protective factor against radiation damage).

Consequently, the images are extremely noisy. For some biological systems, SPA can be used to average images to increase the signal-to-noise ratio and retrieve high-resolution information about the specimen, though it requires that the things being averaged are identical (although some limited conformational heterogeneity, like that of ribosomes, can now be studied). Three-dimensional reconstructions from cryo-TEM images of protein complexes and viruses have been solved to sub-nanometer or near-atomic resolution, allowing new insights into the structure and biology of these large assemblies.

Analyses of ordered arrays of protein, such as 2-D crystals of transmembrane proteins or helical arrays of proteins, also allow averaging for high-resolution information about the specimen via electron crystallography.

==== Vitreous sections ====
The thin film method is limited to thin specimens (typically < 500 nm) because the electrons cannot cross thicker samples without multiple scattering events. Thicker specimens can be vitrified by plunge freezing (cryofixation) in ethane (up to tens of μm in thickness) or more commonly by high-pressure freezing (up to hundreds of μm). They can then be cut into thin sections (40 to 200 nm thick) with a diamond knife in a cryoultramicrotome at temperatures lower than −135 °C (the devitrification temperature). The sections are collected on an electron microscope grid and imaged in the same manner as specimens vitrified in thin film. This technique is called transmission electron cryomicroscopy of vitreous sections (CEMOVIS) or transmission electron cryomicroscopy of frozen-hydrated sections.

=== Material specimens ===
In addition to allowing vitrified biological samples to be imaged, cryoTEM can also be used to image material specimens that are too volatile in a vacuum to image using standard room-temperature electron microscopy. For example, vitrified sections of liquid-solid interfaces can be extracted for analysis by cryo-TEM, and sulfur, which is prone to sublimation in the vacuum of electron microscopes, can be stabilized and imaged in cryo-TEM.

== Image processing ==
Assigning an orientation to each particle and therefore obtaining the best-resolution image in cryo-TEM requires reducing the signal-to-noise ratio. For example, in macromolecule complexes, there are several different structures being projected from 3D to 2D during imaging. Probabilistic approaches are required in order to distinguish structures and avoid blurry results. There are two popular approaches that are widely used in cryo-EM image processing: the maximum likelihood estimation approach, developed in 1998, and the relatively recently adapted Bayesian approach.

In the maximum likelihood estimation approach, all possible orientations of particles are summed up to get the resulting probability distribution (unlike in a typical least squares estimation, where particles are tagged with their exact orientations per image). This way, the particles in the sample get "fuzzy" orientations after calculations, weighted by corresponding probabilities, which improve with iterations. The ideal conditions for making the model that closely represents the real structure is when the data does not have too much noise and the particles do not have any preferential direction. The main downside of the maximum likelihood estimation approach is that the result depends on the initial guess, and model optimization can sometimes get stuck at the local minimum.

The Bayesian approach that is now being used in cryo-TEM is empirical by nature, meaning that the distribution of particles is based on the original dataset. Similarly, in the usual Bayesian method , there is a fixed prior probability that is changed after the data is observed. The main difference from maximum likelihood estimation lies in a special reconstruction term that helps smooth the resulting maps while also decreasing noise during reconstruction. The smoothing of the maps occurs through assuming prior probability to be a Gaussian distribution and analyzing the data in Fourier space. Since the connection between the prior knowledge and the dataset is established, the chances of human error are lower, which potentially increases the objectivity of image reconstruction.

Several software solutions have emerged to automate the processes of cryo-TEM imaging and image reconstruction. For example, the program RELION (REgularized LIkelihood OptimizatioN) is widely used for 3D reconstruction using the Bayesian approach. It offers a range of corrections that improve the resolution of reconstructed images, allows implementing versatile Python scripts, and aids with 2D/3D model classifications or creating de novo models.

== Gallery ==
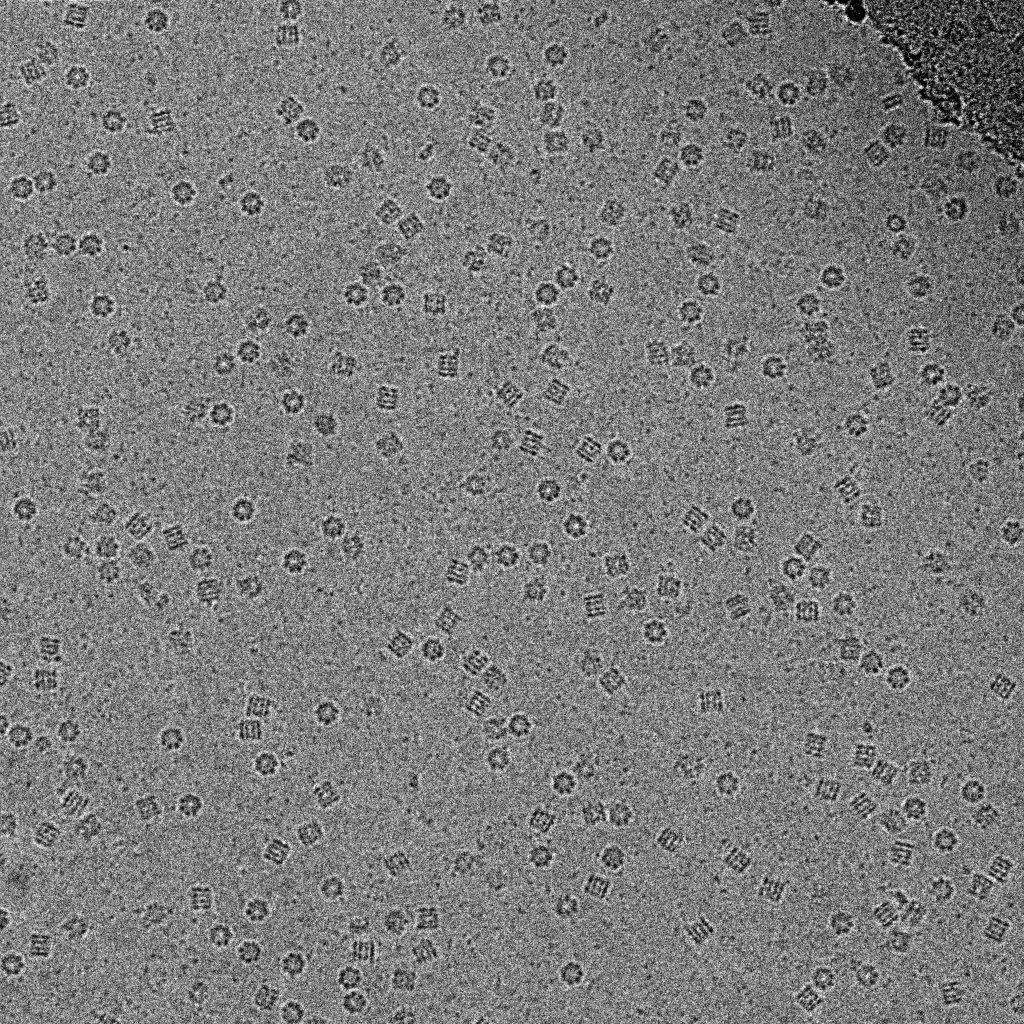
Cryo-EM image of GroEL suspended in amorphous ice at 50000× magnification

Structure of alcohol oxidase from Pichia pastoris by Cryo-EM

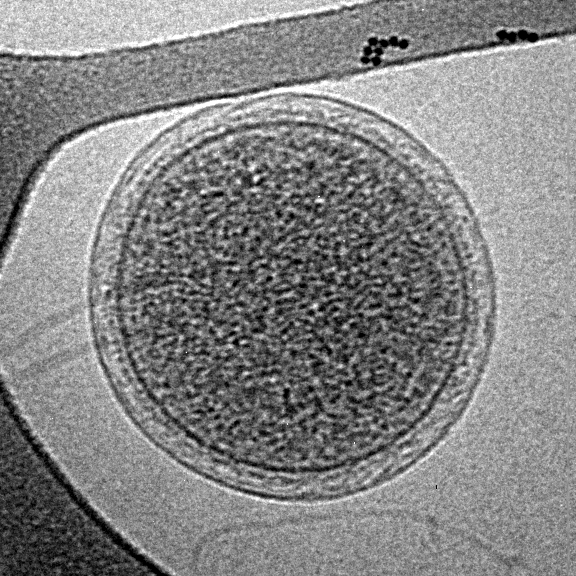
Cryo-EM image of an intact ARMAN cell from an Iron Mountain biofilm. Image width is 576 nm.

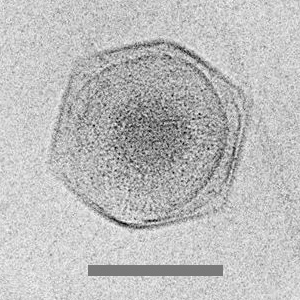
Cryo-EM image of the CroV giant marine virus
(scale bar represents 200 nm)

== See also ==
- Cryogenic scanning electron microscopy
- EM Data Bank
- Resolution (electron density)
- Single particle analysis
- Cryofixation
- Cryo bio-crystallography
- Electron tomography (ET)
- Virus crystallisation
