= Cryo bio-crystallography =

Scientific study of macromolecules

Cryo bio-crystallography is the application of crystallography to biological macromolecules at cryogenic temperatures.

== Basic principles ==
Cryo crystallography enables X-ray data collection at cryogenic temperatures, typically 100 K.

- Crystals are transferred from the solution they have grown in (called mother liquor) to a solution with a cryo-protectant to prevent ice formation.
- Crystals are mounted in a glass fiber (as opposed to a capillary.)
- Crystals are cooled by dipping directly into liquid nitrogen and then placed in a cryo cold stream.
- Cryo cooled macromolecular crystals show reduced radiation damage by more than 70 times that at room temperature.

== Advantages ==
- Significant improvement of resolution in data collection
- Reduced or eliminated radiation damage in crystals

== Usefulness and applications ==
Crystallography of large biological macromolecules can be achieved while maintaining their solution state. The best known example is the ribosome. Today, liquid nitrogen cryo cooling is used for protein crystallography at every synchrotron around the world. Radiation damaged is reduced by more than 70 fold at cryo temperatures. A recent review paper explains the development of reduced radiation damage in macromolecular crystals at Synchrotrons and describes how more than 90% of all structures deposited in the Protein Data Bank used cryo cooling in their determination.

2020 Haas, DJ. The early history of cryo-cooling for macromolecular crystallography (2020) IUCrJ (2020). 7, 148–157. https://journals.iucr.org/m/issues/2020/02/00/be5283/be5283.pdf 1970 Haas, D.J., and Rossmann, M.G.

            Crystallographic Studies on Lactate Dehydrogenase at -75 C.  Acta Crystallogr.  (1970), B26, 998.

== See also ==
- X-ray crystallography
- Cryo-EM
- Ada Yonath
