= Ada Yonath =

Israeli chemist (1939–2026)

- עדה יונת
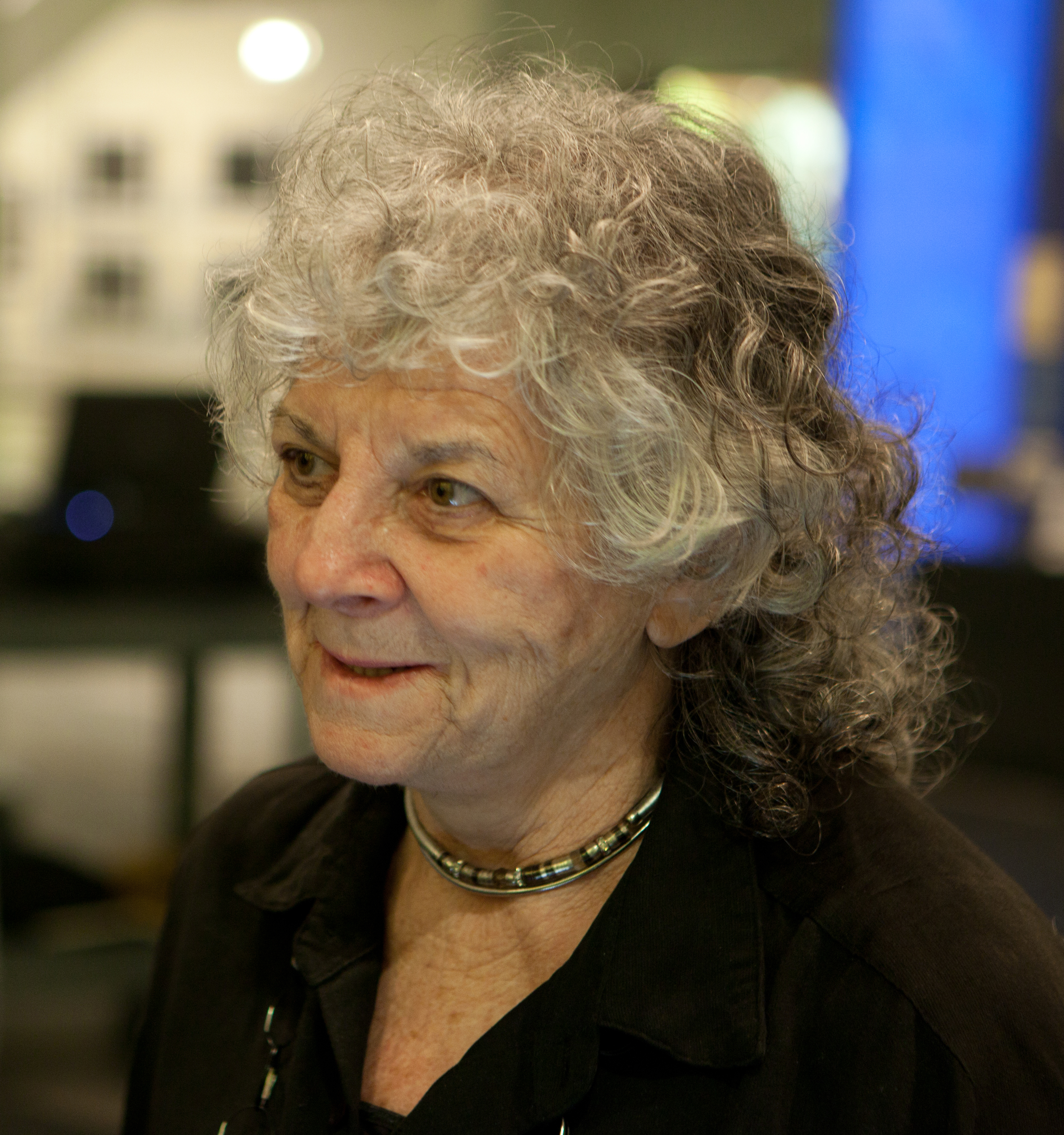
- Yonath in 2013
- Born: Ada Esther Lifshitz; 22 June 1939; Jerusalem, Mandatory Palestine
- Died: 31 August 2026 (aged 87)
- Citizenship: Israeli
- Education: Hebrew University of Jerusalem (BSc, MSc); Weizmann Institute of Science (PhD)
- Known for: Cryo bio-crystallography
- Awards: Harvey Prize (2002); Louisa Gross Horwitz Prize(2005); Wolf Prize in Chemistry (2006); L'Oréal-UNESCO Award for Women in Science (2008); Albert Einstein World Award of Science (2008); Nobel Prize in Chemistry (2009)
- Scientific career
- Fields: Crystallography
- Workplaces: Weizmann Institute of Science; University of Chicago
- Doctoral advisor: Wolfie Traub, F. Albert Cotton

Ada Esther Yonath (Hebrew: עדה יונת, pronounced [ˈada joˈnat]; née Lifshitz; 22 June 1939 – 31 August 2026) was an Israeli crystallographer and Nobel laureate in chemistry, best known for her pioneering work on the structure of ribosomes. She was the director of the Helen and Milton A. Kimmelman Center for Biomolecular Structure and Assembly of the Weizmann Institute of Science.

In 2009, Yonath received the Nobel Prize in Chemistry along with Venkatraman Ramakrishnan and Thomas A. Steitz for her studies on the structure and function of the ribosome, becoming the first Israeli woman to win the Nobel Prize.

== Early life ==
Ada Esther Lifshitz was born in the Geula quarter of Jerusalem on 22 June 1939. Her parents, Hillel and Esther Lifshitz, were Zionist Jews who had immigrated to the British Mandate of Palestine (now Israel) from Zduńska Wola, Poland, in 1933 before the establishment of Israel. Her father was a rabbi and came from a rabbinical family. They settled in Jerusalem and ran a grocery store, but found it difficult to make ends meet while also sharing a small apartment space to live in.

Despite her family's poverty, her parents sent her to school in the upscale Beit HaKerem neighborhood to assure her a good education. When her father died at the age of 42, the family moved to Tel Aviv. Yonath assisted her mother in bringing income by babysitting or tutoring children after her father's death.

=== Education ===
Yonath was accepted to Tichon Hadash high school. Since her mother could not pay the tuition, she traded her time teaching math lessons to students, which helped pay for her schooling. At a young age, she said, she was inspired by the scientist Marie Curie. However, she stressed that Curie, whom she as a child was fascinated by after reading her biography, was not her "role model". She returned to Jerusalem for college, graduating from the Hebrew University of Jerusalem with a bachelor's degree in chemistry in 1962, and a master's degree in biochemistry in 1964. In 1968, she obtained her PhD from the Weizmann Institute of Science for X-ray crystallographic studies on the structure of collagen, with Wolfie Traub as her PhD advisor.

== Scientific career ==
Yonath accepted postdoctoral positions at Carnegie Mellon University (1969) and MIT (1970). While a postdoctoral researcher at MIT she spent some time in the laboratory of subsequent 1976 chemistry Nobel Prize winner William N. Lipscomb, Jr. of Harvard University where she was inspired to pursue very large structures.

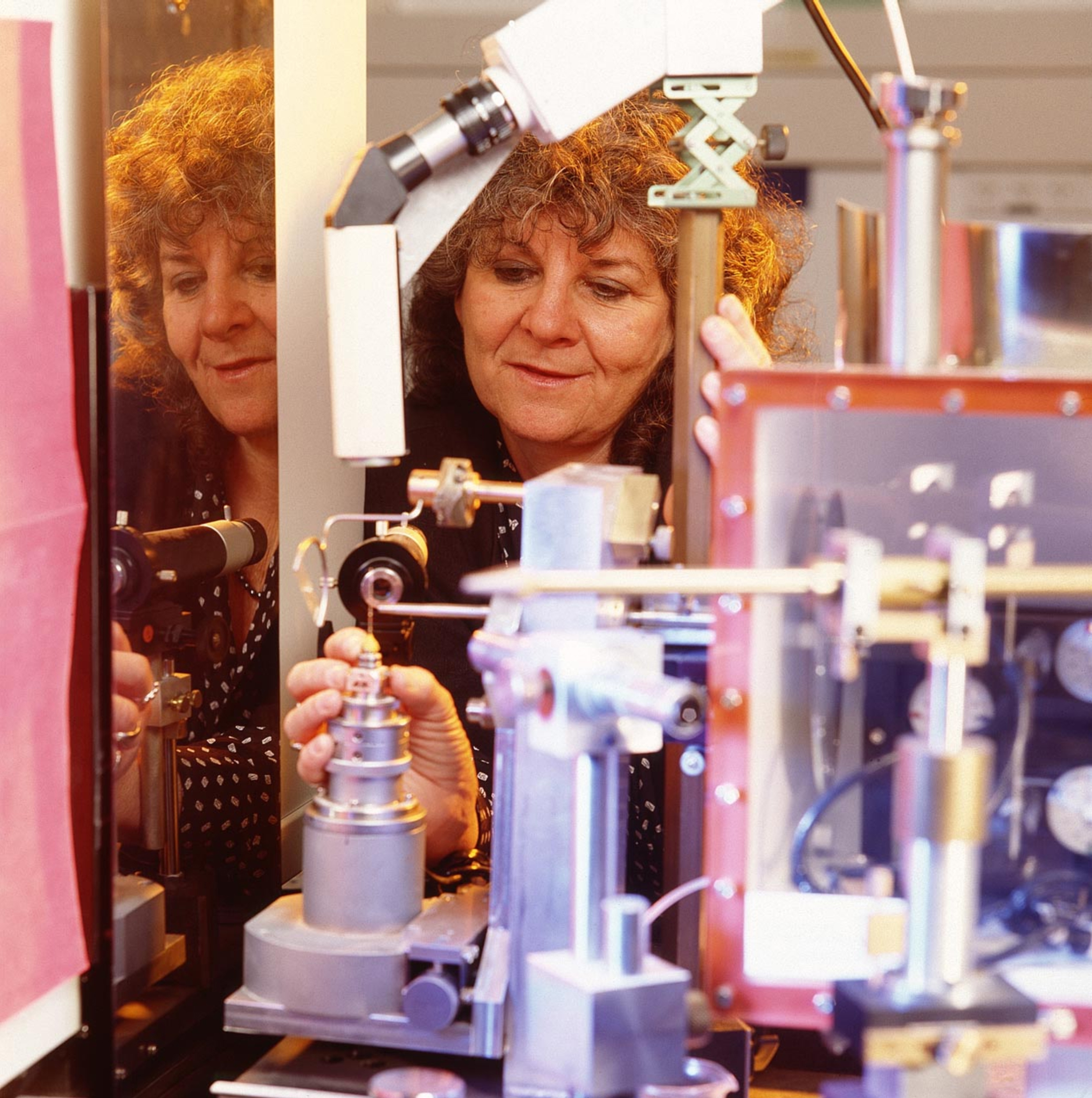
Yonath at the Weizmann Institute of Science

In 1970, she established what was for nearly a decade the only protein crystallography laboratory in Israel. Then, from 1979 to 1984 she was a group leader with Heinz-Günter Wittmann at the Max Planck Institute for Molecular Genetics in Berlin. She was a visiting professor at the University of Chicago in 1977–78. She headed a Max-Planck Institute Research Unit at DESY in Hamburg, Germany (1986–2004) in parallel to her research activities at the Weizmann Institute.

She focused on the mechanisms underlying protein biosynthesis, by ribosomal crystallography, a research line she pioneered over 20 years ago despite considerable skepticism of the international scientific community. Ribosomes translate RNA into protein and because they have slightly different structures in microbes, when compared to eukaryotes, such as human cells, they are often a target for antibiotics. In 1993, she visualized the path taken by the nascent proteins, namely the ribosomal tunnel, and recently revealed the dynamics elements enabling its involvement in elongation arrest, gating, intra-cellular regulation and nascent chain trafficking into their folding space.

In 2000 and 2001, she determined the complete high-resolution structures of both ribosomal subunits and discovered within the otherwise asymmetric ribosome, the universal symmetrical region that provides the framework and navigates the process of polypeptide polymerization. Consequently, she showed that the ribosome is a ribozyme that places its substrates in stereochemistry suitable for peptide bond formation and for substrate-mediated catalysis.

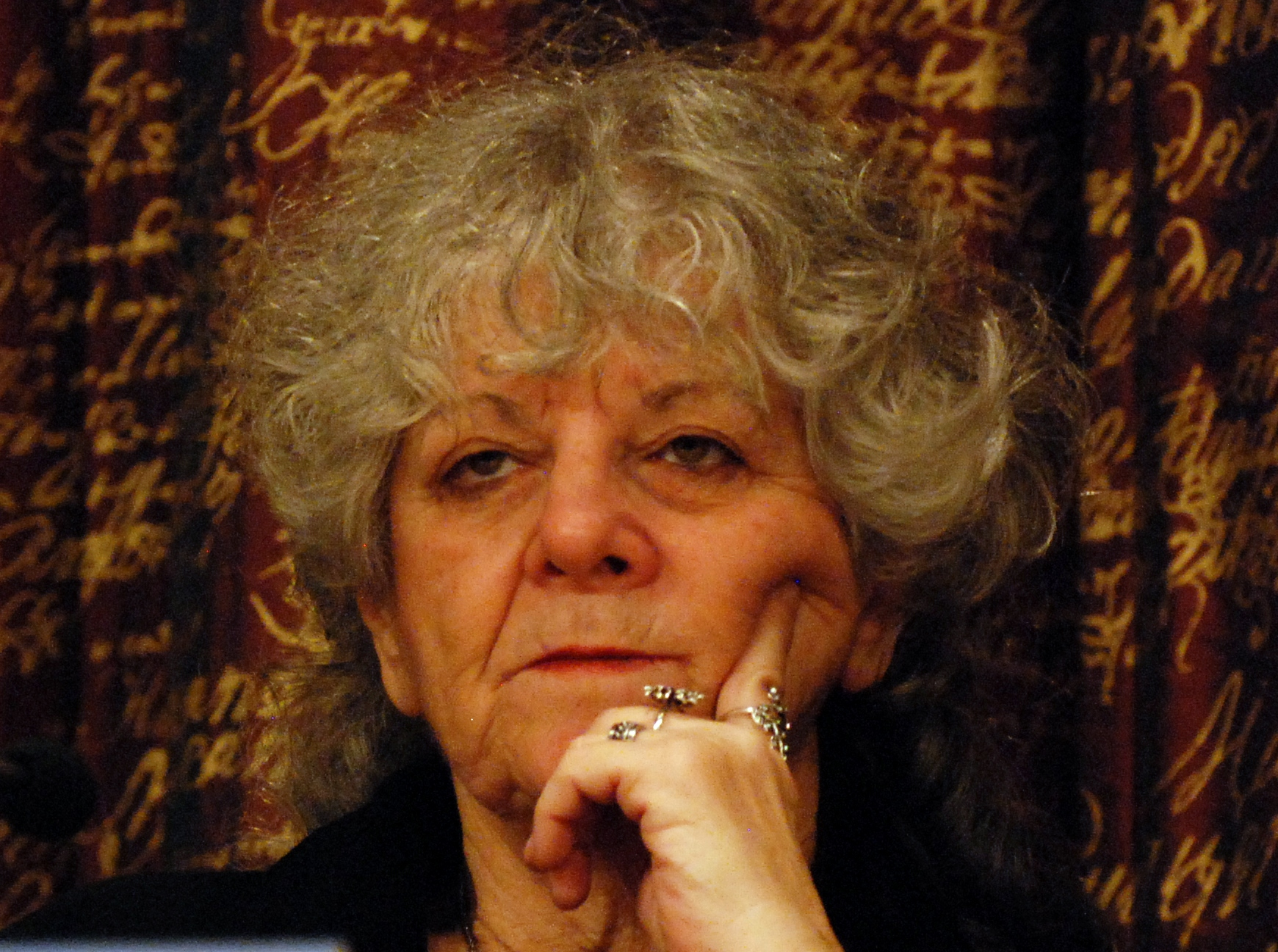
Yonath at a press conference after winning the Nobel prize in 2009

Additionally, Yonath elucidated the modes of action of over twenty different antibiotics targeting the ribosome, illuminated mechanisms of drug resistance and synergism, deciphered the structural basis for antibiotic selectivity and showed how it plays a key role in clinical usefulness and therapeutic effectiveness, thus paving the way for structure-based drug design.

For enabling ribosomal crystallography Yonath introduced a novel technique, cryo bio-crystallography, which became routine in structural biology and allowed intricate projects otherwise considered formidable.

In 2009, Yonath received the Nobel Prize in Chemistry along with Venkatraman Ramakrishnan and Thomas A. Steitz for her studies on the structure and function of the ribosome, becoming the first Israeli woman to win the Nobel Prize out of ten Israeli Nobel laureates. She also became the first woman from the Middle East to win a Nobel prize in the sciences, and the first woman in 45 years to win the Nobel Prize for Chemistry.

At the Weizmann Institute, Yonath was the director of the Martin S. and Helen Kimmel Professorial Chair.

== Personal life and death ==
Yonath was married to Moshe Yonath. Their marriage ended in divorce. They had one daughter, Hagit Yonath, a doctor at Sheba Medical Center, and a granddaughter, Noa. Yonath was the cousin of anti-occupation activist Ruchama Marton as their mothers were sisters. Ada Yonath died on August 31, 2026 at the age of 87.

== Legacy ==
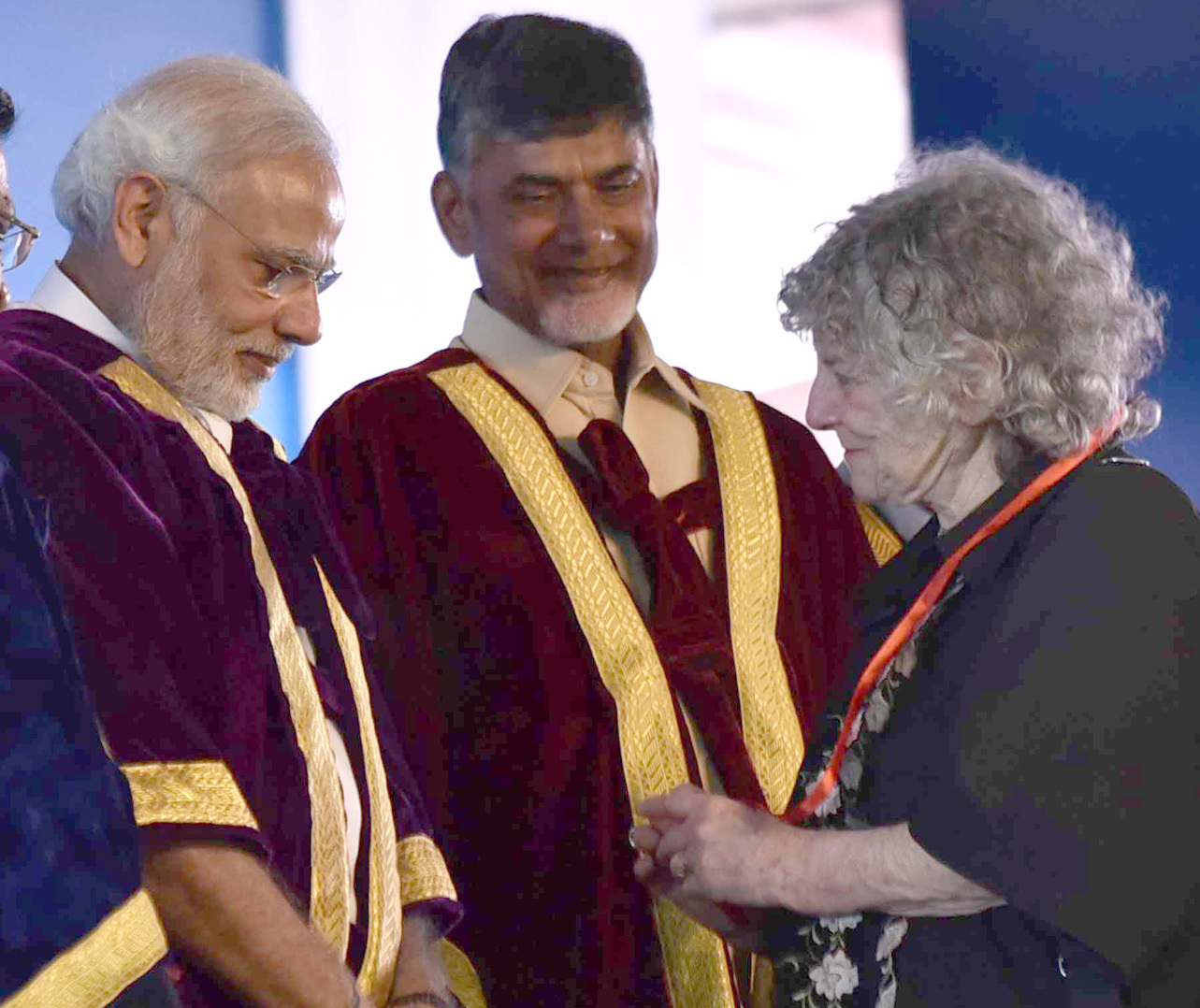
Yonath with Indian Prime Minister Narendra Modi and Chief Minister N. Chandrababu Naidu at a session for the ISCA in 2017

As the first woman since 1964 to win the Nobel Prize in chemistry, and the first since Dorothy Crowfoot Hodgkin, 45 years previously. She was also the fourth of eight women ever to win the Nobel Prize in chemistry. Although Yonath once remarked, “I am a scientist, not male or female. A scientist,” her 2009 award was noted as a highlight for female scientists. The Australian noted that Yonath's Nobel win was "crushing the lab's glass ceiling". Regarded as an influential Israeli scientist, Yonath helped established the first protein crystallography laboratory in Israel.

In 2018, while interviewing Yonath, UNESCO noted that her scientific research has also been "key to understanding how antibiotics work".

Following her death, The New York Times noted that Yonath's mapping of the ribosome led to new designs for antibiotics. Her work was noted as "boundary pushing" with it having "immediate and practical consequences" for medicine and in the "fight against infectious disease". President Isaac Herzog noted Yonath as "one of the leading researchers in the history of Israeli science". The Hindu also noted Yonath's academic impact, especially in India through her engagements in academic institutions in the country.

== Awards and recognition ==
Telephone interview with Ada Yonath during the announcement of the Nobel Prize

Yonath was a member of the United States National Academy of Sciences; the American Academy of Arts and Sciences; the Israel Academy of Sciences and Humanities; the European Academy of Sciences and Art and the European Molecular Biology Organization.

On 18 October 2014, Yonath was named an ordinary member of the Pontifical Academy of Sciences by Pope Francis.

Her awards and honors included the following:

- In 2002, Israel Prize
- In 2005, Louisa Gross Horwitz Prize (Columbia University)
- In 2006, Wolf Prize in Chemistry along with George Feher.
- In 2006, The EMET Prize for Art, Science and Culture in Life Sciences, along with Professor Peretz Lavie (Medicine) and Professor Eli Keshet (Biology)
- In 2007, Paul Ehrlich and Ludwig Darmstaedter Prize along with Harry Noller
- In 2008, the Albert Einstein World Award of Science for her pioneering contributions to protein biosynthesis in the field of ribosomal crystallography and her introduction of innovative techniques in cryo bio-crystallography.
- In 2009, the Nobel Prize in Chemistry (co-recipient with Thomas Steitz and Venkatraman Ramakrishnan). She was the first Israeli woman to be awarded a Nobel Prize.
- In 2010, Wilhelm Exner Medal
- In 2011, Marie Curie Medal awarded by the Polish Chemical Society
- In 2013 she became a member of the German Academy of Sciences Leopoldina.
- In 2015, she was awarded Honorary Doctorates from the University of Southern California, the De La Salle University, Manila/Philippines; the Joseph Fourier University, Grenoble/France; the Medical University of Lodz, Lodz/Poland; and the University of Warwick, UK.
- In 2018, Elizabeth Cabezas, President of the Ecuadorian National Assembly, presented Yonath with the Presea "Asamblea Nacional de la República del Ecuador, Dra. Matilde Hidalgo de Procel" (National Assembly of Ecuador Dr. Matilde Hidalgo de Procel Medal) for scientific merit.
- In 2018, she was awarded an Honorary Doctorate from Carnegie Mellon University
- In 2020, she was elected a Foreign Member of the Royal Society
- In 2023, she was awarded an Honorary Doctorate from the Jagiellonian University.
- In 2024, she was awarded an Honorary Doctorate from the Technion.

== See also ==
- List of Israel Prize recipients
- List of female Nobel laureates
- List of Israeli Nobel laureates
- List of Jewish Nobel laureates
- List of peace activists
