= Scanning electron cryomicroscopy =

Scanning electron cryomicroscopy (CryoSEM) is a form of electron microscopy where a hydrated but cryogenically fixed sample is imaged on a scanning electron microscope's cold stage in a cryogenic chamber. The cooling is usually achieved with liquid nitrogen. CryoSEM of biological samples with a high moisture content can be done faster with fewer sample preparation steps than conventional SEM. In addition, the dehydration processes needed to prepare a biological sample for a conventional SEM chamber create numerous distortions in the tissue leading to structural artifacts during imaging.

== See also ==
- Electron microscopy
- Electron cryomicroscopy
- Transmission electron cryomicroscopy
