= REG1B =

Protein-coding gene in the species Homo sapiens

Identifiers
- Aliases: REG1B, PSPS2, REGH, REGI-BETA, REGL, regenerating family member 1 beta
- External IDs: OMIM: 167771; MGI: 97896; GeneCards: REG1B

Gene location (Human)
Chr.	Chromosome 2 (human)
Band	2p12	Start	79,085,023 bp
Band	2p12	End	79,088,019 bp

Gene location (Mouse)
Chr.	Chromosome 6 (mouse)
Band	6|6 C3	Start	78,372,606 bp
Band	6|6 C3	End	78,385,089 bp
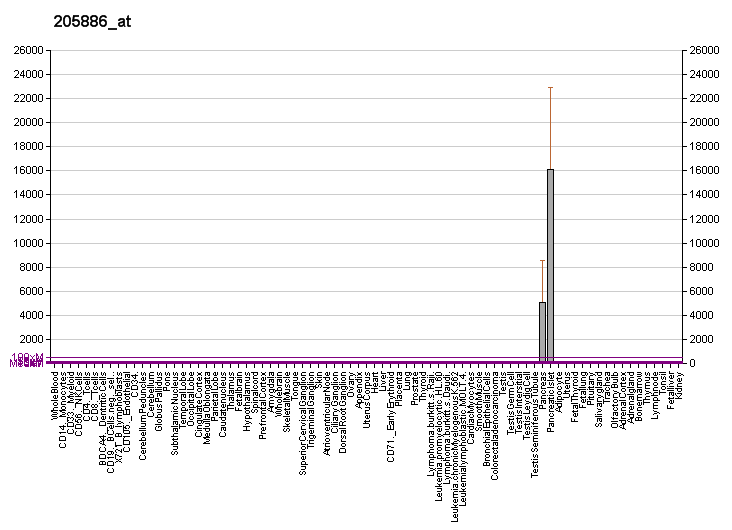
RNA expression pattern
Bgee	Human / Mouse (ortholog); Top expressed in: body of pancreas; islet of Langerhans; beta cell; mucosa of ileum; appendix; duodenum; apex of heart; right coronary artery; right uterine tube; ectocervix / Top expressed in: pyloric antrum; islet of Langerhans; duodenum; embryo; morula; blastocyst; upper arm; tibiofemoral joint; triceps brachii muscle; lumbar spinal ganglion; More reference expression data
BioGPS	More reference expression data
Gene ontology
Molecular function	carbohydrate binding; transmembrane signaling receptor activity; peptidoglycan binding; oligosaccharide binding
Cellular component	extracellular region; extracellular exosome; extracellular space
Biological process	cell population proliferation; positive regulation of cell population proliferation; response to peptide hormone; cell wall disruption in other organism; antimicrobial humoral immune response mediated by antimicrobial peptide
Sources:Amigo / QuickGO
Orthologs
Databases	NCBI: entry; OMA: entry
Species	Human	Mouse
Entrez	5968	19693
Ensembl	ENSG00000172023	ENSMUSG00000023140
UniProt	P48304	Q08731
RefSeq (mRNA)	NM_006507	NM_009043
RefSeq (protein)	NP_006498	NP_033069
Location (UCSC)	Chr 2: 79.09 – 79.09 Mb	Chr 6: 78.37 – 78.39 Mb
PubMed search
- Wikidata
View/Edit Human	View/Edit Mouse

Lithostathine-1-beta is a protein that in humans is encoded by the REG1B gene.

== Function ==
This gene is a type I subclass member of the Reg gene family. The Reg gene family is a multigene family grouped into four subclasses, types I, II, III and IV based on the primary structures of the encoded proteins. This gene encodes a protein that is secreted by the exocrine pancreas. It is associated with islet cell regeneration and diabetogenesis and may be involved in pancreatic lithogenesis. Reg family members REG1A, REGL, PAP and this gene are tandemly clustered on chromosome 2p12 and may have arisen from the same ancestral gene by gene duplication.
