= REG1A =

Protein-coding gene in the species Homo sapiens

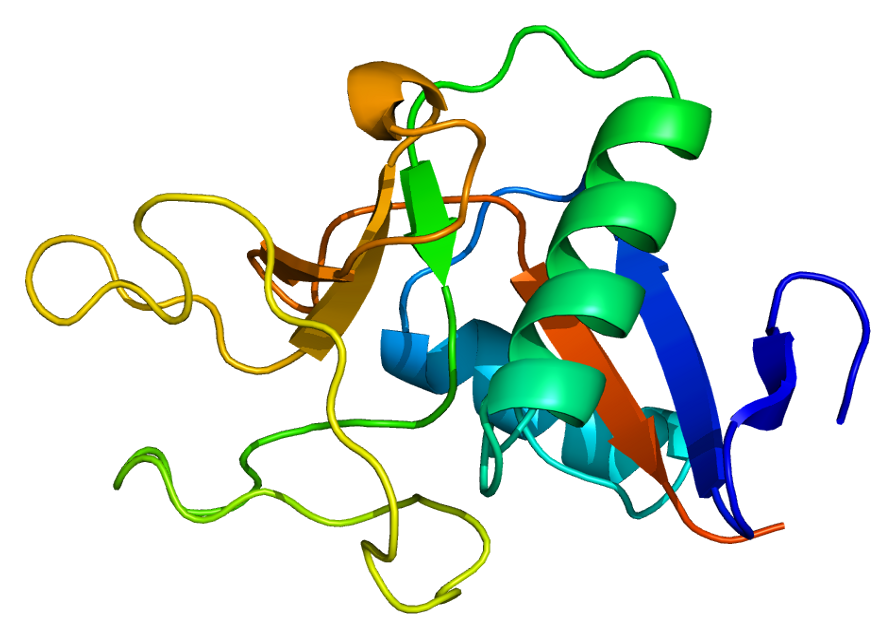

Identifiers
- Aliases: REG1A, ICRF, P19, PSP, PSPS, PSPS1, PTP, REG, regenerating family member 1 alpha
- External IDs: OMIM: 167770; MGI: 97895; GeneCards: REG1A
Available structures
PDB	Ortholog search: PDBe RCSB
PDB	List of PDB id codes 1LIT, 1QDD

Gene location (Human)
Chr.	Chromosome 2 (human)
Band	2p12	Start	79,120,362 bp
Band	2p12	End	79,123,409 bp
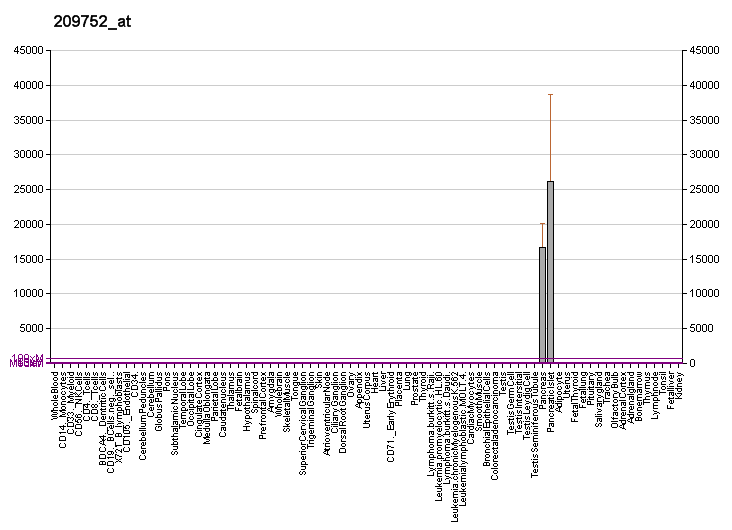
RNA expression pattern
Bgee	Human / Mouse (ortholog); Top expressed in: body of pancreas; islet of Langerhans; beta cell; duodenum; mucosa of ileum; jejunal mucosa; pancreatic ductal cell; pylorus; gallbladder; cardia / n/a; More reference expression data
BioGPS	More reference expression data
Gene ontology
Molecular function	carbohydrate binding; growth factor activity; transmembrane signaling receptor activity; signaling receptor binding; phosphatase binding; protein phosphatase binding; identical protein binding; protein homodimerization activity; peptidoglycan binding; oligosaccharide binding
Cellular component	extracellular region; extracellular exosome; extracellular space; cytosol; growth cone; dendrite membrane; neuronal cell body membrane; protein-containing complex; zymogen granule; basal part of cell; perinuclear region of cytoplasm
Biological process	positive regulation of cell population proliferation; regulation of signaling receptor activity; response to hypoxia; midgut development; negative regulation of cell population proliferation; positive regulation of gene expression; response to organic cyclic compound; response to nutrient levels; wound healing; response to peptide hormone; cell wall disruption in other organism; protein homooligomerization; protein homotetramerization; calcium ion homeostasis; antimicrobial humoral immune response mediated by antimicrobial peptide; liver regeneration; response to acetylsalicylate; positive regulation of dendrite extension; positive regulation of type B pancreatic cell proliferation; positive regulation of acinar cell proliferation; response to water-immersion restraint stress; pancreas regeneration; response to growth hormone-releasing hormone; response to gastrin; cellular response to chemokine; cellular response to gastrin; signal transduction
Sources:Amigo / QuickGO
Orthologs
Databases	NCBI: entry; OMA: entry
Species	Human	Mouse
Entrez	5967	19692
Ensembl	ENSG00000115386	n/a
UniProt	P05451	P43137
RefSeq (mRNA)	NM_002909	NM_009042
RefSeq (protein)	NP_002900	NP_033068
Location (UCSC)	Chr 2: 79.12 – 79.12 Mb	n/a
PubMed search
- Wikidata
View/Edit Human	View/Edit Mouse

Pancreatic Stone Protein (PSP), also known as Lithostathine-1-alpha islet cells regeneration factor (ICRF) or islet of Langerhans regenerating protein (REG) is a protein that in humans is encoded by the REG1A gene as a single polypeptide of 144 amino acids further cleaved by trypsin to produce a 133 amino acid protein that is O-linked glycosylated on threonine 27. This protein is a type I subclass member of the Regenerating protein family. The Reg protein family is a multi protein family grouped into four subclasses, types I, II, III and IV based on the primary structures of the proteins. Reg family members REG1B, REGL, PAP and this gene are tandemly clustered on chromosome 2p12 and may have arisen from the same ancestral gene by gene duplication. The PSP is mostly produced in Human by the acinar cells of the pancreas and is secreted in the duodenum by the same pathway that pancreatic exocrine enzymes. It has C-terminal C-type lectin domain whose binding partner is currently unknown.

== Function ==
=== Pancreas development and regeneration ===
The PSP has been shown to be associated with islet cell regeneration and diabetogenesis and may be involved in pancreatic lithogenesis (creation of pancreatic stones; pancreatic calculi).

=== Sepsis ===
The blood PSP concentration has been shown to increase substantially in response to a sepsis event. Consequently, the use of the PSP as a biomarker of sepsis has been investigated thoroughly and the result of these researches confirmed the high diagnostic accuracy of the PSP for sepsis. Of particular interest, PSP concentration has been shown to increase early in the development of a septic event, as illustrated in a cohort of severely burnt patients
