= Glycan array =

Glycan arrays, like that offered by the Consortium for Functional Glycomics (CFG), National Center for Functional Glycomics (NCFG) and Z Biotech, contain carbohydrate compounds that can be screened with lectins, antibodies or cell receptors to define carbohydrate specificity and identify ligands. Glycan array screening works in much the same way as other microarrays used, for instance, to study gene expression (DNA microarrays) or protein interaction (protein microarrays).

Glycan arrays are composed of various oligosaccharides and polysaccharides immobilized on a solid support in a spatially defined arrangement. This technology provides the means of studying glycan–protein interactions in a high-throughput environment. These natural or synthetic (see carbohydrate synthesis) glycans are then incubated with any glycan-binding protein such as lectins, cell surface receptors or possibly a whole organism such as a virus. Binding is quantified using fluorescence-based detection methods. Certain types of glycan microarrays can even be re-used for multiple samples using a method called microwave assisted wet-erase.

== Applications ==
Glycan arrays have been used to characterize previously unknown biochemical interactions. For example, photo-generated glycan arrays have been used to characterize the immunogenic properties of a tetrasaccharide found on the surface of anthrax spores. Hence, glycan array technology can be used to study the specificity of host–pathogen interactions.

Early on, glycan arrays were proven useful in determining the specificity of the hemagglutinin of the influenza A virus binding to the host and distinguishing across different strains of flu (including avian from mammalian). This was shown with CFG arrays as well as customized arrays. Cross-platform benchmarks led to highlight the effect of glycan presentation and spacing on binding.

Glycan arrays can be combined with other techniques such as surface plasmon resonance (SPR) to refine the characterization of glycan-binding. For example, this combination led to demonstrate the calcium-dependent heparin binding of annexin A1 that is involved in several biological processes including inflammation, apoptosis and membrane trafficking.
