= CFG =

CFG may stand for:

== Businesses ==
- China Film Group, a Chinese film studio
- City Football Group, a British-based owner of football clubs
- Citizens Financial Group, a regional American bank
- Condor (airline), Germany (ICAO: CFG)

== Science, technology and mathematics ==
- Characteristic function game, in game theory
- Consortium for Functional Glycomics, a biochemical research initiative
- Context-free grammar, in computer science, a type of formal grammar
- Control-flow graph, in computer science, showing all paths a program might traverse
- Configuration file, used to set up a computer program
- Classifier-free guidance, in diffusion models of machine learning

== Other uses ==
- Canada's Food Guide, by Health Canada
- Jaime González Airport, Cienfuegos, Cuba (IATA:CFG)

== See also ==
- CFGS (disambiguation)
