= CFGS =

CFGS may refer to:

- CFGS-DT, a French-language Canadian television station
- China Film Giant Screen, a large-screen film format company
- Churston Ferrers Grammar School, Devon, England

== See also ==
- CFG (disambiguation)
