= Regenerating protein family =

The regenerating protein family often abbreviated as Reg family are a group of small secretory proteins that are involved in the proliferation and differentiation of diverse cell types. In addition they are important in protecting cells from death caused by damage or inflammation.

== Family members ==
There are seven types of Reg genes present in the mouse mainly located on chromosome 6 but only five (REG1A, REG1B, REG3A, REG3G, and REG4) have been shown to be present in the human on chromosome 2.

== Function ==
Reg proteins are involved in the growth and differentiation of cells from various organs under normal and disease conditions. These proteins function as acute phase reactants, lectins, antiapoptotic factors or growth factors for pancreatic β-cells, neural cells and epithelial cells in the digestive system.

These C-type lectins contain a single carbohydrate recognition domain and once secreted, these soluble proteins act in an autocrine and/or paracrine manner to exert their effects on their cognate receptors, where they may stimulate an anti-microbial, anti-inflammatory, anti-apoptotic, or regenerative response depending on the tissue type. Cytokines such as IL-22 are major regulators of the expression of Reg proteins.

== Clinical significance ==
Reg family members such as REG1A and REG1B are associated with various diseases such as diabetes and gastrointestinal cancer. Reg expression has been associated with islet regeneration in pancreas that may be important for islet transplantation and for diabetes therapy and for cancer studies.

The mouse Reg1, Reg2, and Reg3δ, expressed by β-cells and acinar cells respectively, have been shown to be linked with pancreatic β-cell regeneration in the mouse by activating cyclin D1 and promoting β-cell cycle progression. Reg2 is substantially up-regulated in the pancreatic islets, particularly in the β-cells following mycobacterial adjuvant treatment. This is related to the induction of Th17 cells by adjuvant treatment and these cells produce Interleukin-22 (IL-22). Pancreatic islets express high levels of IL-22 receptor and IL-22 has been shown to induce islet beta cell regeneration.
