= James C. Paulson =

American biochemist and biologist

- Education: MacMurray College, University of Illinois Urbana-Champaign
- Awards: United States EPA Green Chemistry Challenge Award, Barnett Lecture, Bijvoet Medal, Karl Meyer Award
- Scientific career
- Fields: Biochemistry
- Workplaces: The Scripps Research Institute

James C. Paulson is an American biochemist and biologist known for his work in glycobiology.

== Career ==
A graduate of MacMurray College and University of Illinois at Urbana–Champaign (M.S., Ph.D.), Paulson was a faculty member and vice-chair of the Department of Biological Chemistry at UCLA School of Medicine (now David Geffen School of Medicine at UCLA) from 1978-1990. In 1996, he began working for Cytel Corporation, where he was vice president, chief scientific officer, and member of the Board of Directors.

In 1999, he joined the full-time faculty of The Scripps Research Institute. In 2001, he became principal researcher and founding director of the National Institutes of Health-funded Consortium for Functional Glycomics. In 2013, he was appointed chair of the institute's Department of Cell and Molecular Biology. From August 2014 to September 2015, he was the institute's acting president and CEO.

Paulson is currently Cecil H. and Ida Green Professor and co-chair of Department of Molecular Medicine at The Scripps Research Institute.

Paulson’s research program focuses on the field of glycomics, the study of sugars on a molecular level. His work, which may have implications for the treatment of cancer, influenza, and bacterial infections, has been recognized by awards including: Melville L. Wolfram Award; Karl Meyer Award; Bijvoet Medal, Bijvoet Center for Biomolecular Research, Utrecht University; Barnett Lecture, Northeastern University; and United States EPA Green Chemistry Challenge Award.

== Associations ==
Paulson is currently a Glycobiology (journal) editor and past-chair of the American Chemical Society Division of Carbohydrate Chemistry. He is also an advisory board member for: the Joint Center for Structural Genomics, PSI Biology; the Boston University Mass Spectrometry Resource; Alberta Glycomics Centre; Institute for Biological Sciences, NRC, Ottawa; Center of Excellence in Influenza Research and Surveillance, St. Jude Children's Research Hospital and Glyco-Net.
