= Scripps Research =

Nonprofit American medical research institute

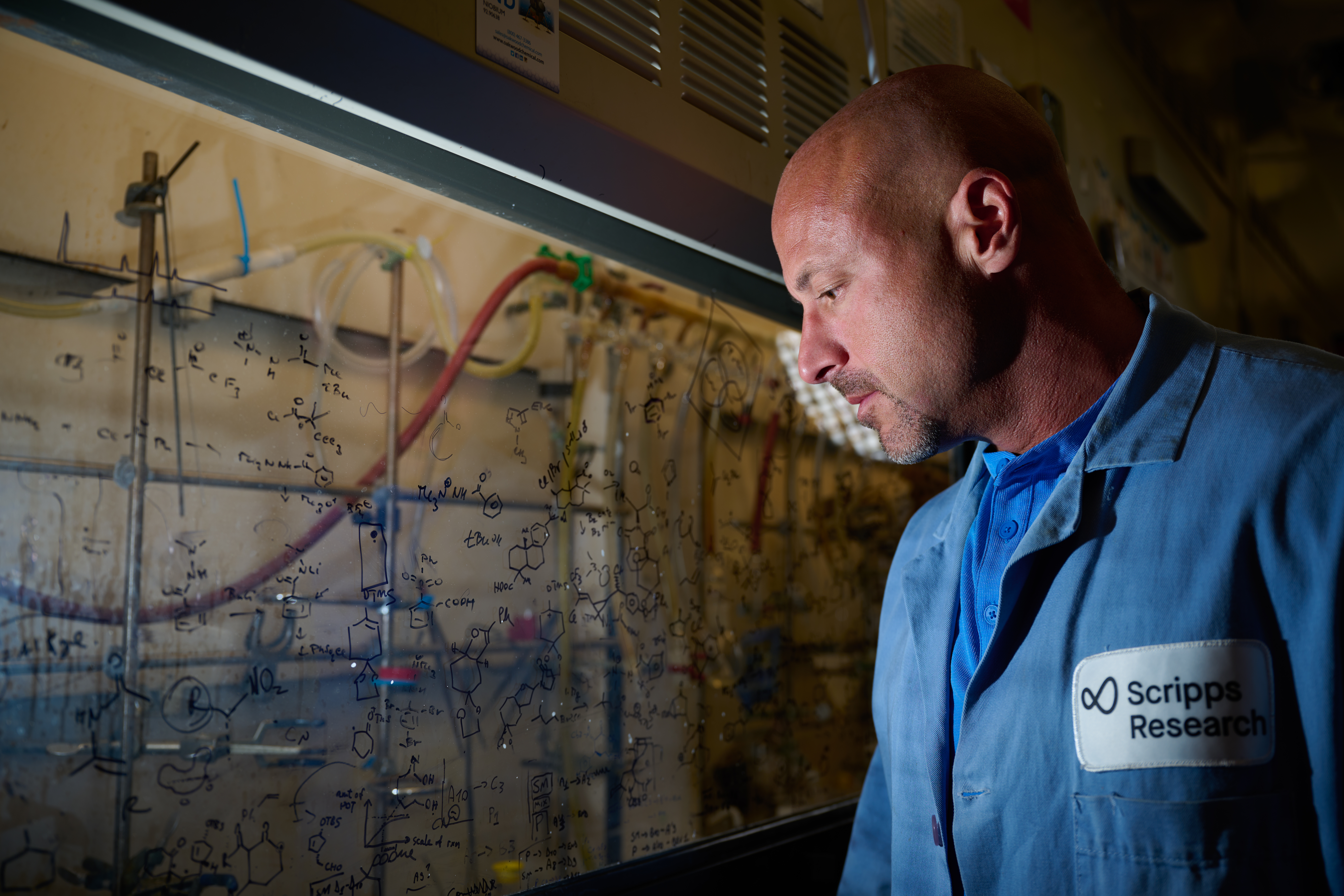
- A Scripps Research chemist (Phil S. Baran) wearing an institute lab coat
- Established: 1924; 102 years ago
- Faculty: 173
- Staff: 2,100
- Location: San Diego, California, US
- Coordinates: 32.8929°N 117.2427°W
- Interactive map of Scripps Research
- Website: www.scripps.edu

Scripps Research is a nonprofit American medical research facility that focuses on research and education in the biomedical sciences. Headquartered in San Diego, California, the institute has over 170 laboratories employing 2,100 scientists, technicians, graduate students, and administrative and other staff.

The institute holds over 1,100 patents, has produced 11 FDA-approved therapeutics, and has generated over 50 spin-off companies. The Scripps Research graduate program is ranked 1st nationally in the biological sciences, and 7th for chemistry.

In 2022, their Jupiter, Florida, campus became a part of the University of Florida. Jupiter-based graduate students remain part of the Scripps Research graduate program.

== History ==
Scripps Research began with the Scripps Metabolic Clinic, founded near the current site in the La Jolla area of San Diego in 1924 by philanthropist Ellen Browning Scripps, who was inspired by the discovery of insulin. In 1946, the metabolic clinic separated from Scripps Memorial Hospital.

In 1956, Scripps Research was renamed Scripps Clinic and Research Foundation to reflect its broader focus and management's renewed commitment to biomedical research. Harvard biochemist A. Baird Hastings joined the institute in 1959, followed by immunologist Frank J. Dixon and colleagues William Weigle, Joseph Feldman, Charles Cochrane, and Jacinto Vazquez in 1961, biochemist Frank Huennekens and microbiologist John Spizizen in 1962. Dixon was appointed director of research operations in 1974, and in 1977 these operations assumed the name of The Research Institute of Scripps Clinic.

Upon Dixon's retirement in 1986, Richard Lerner, who had been chair of the Scripps Department of Molecular Biology, was appointed the research institute's new director. In 1989, the institute launched a graduate program. In 1991, as the result of a merger of hospitals, the research branch became part of a larger organization, the Scripps Institutions of Medicine and Science. In 1993, the research division separated from the clinical side, becoming an independent nonprofit organization under the name of the Scripps Research Institute (TSRI). An additional campus in Florida was instituted in 2004.

Michael Marletta became president and CEO in 2012, assuming the position from Lerner. Marletta announced his resignation on July 21, 2014, and James C. Paulson was subsequently appointed acting president and CEO.

In September 2015, Peter G. Schultz was appointed CEO, and Steve A. Kay, president. Kay announced he was returning to the University of Southern California in August 2016.

In October 2016, TSRI announced a strategic affiliation with the non-profit California Institute for Biomedical Research (Calibr). The two organizations had already collaborated on several research programs in recent years, including the development of an antibody engineering platform aimed at improving treatments for chronic diseases such as diabetes and COPD, and immune therapies for the treatment of cancer. Calibr now represents the drug discovery and development division of Scripps Research.

In February 2017, 5AM Ventures' John Diekman was named chairman of the board.

In July 2018, TSRI was officially rebranded to Scripps Research.

The Scripps Institution of Oceanography is often incorrectly associated with Scripps Research; it is in fact a nearby research facility that is part of UC San Diego. Scripps Research is a private nonprofit institute not directly associated with UCSD. Confusingly, the Scripps Institution of Oceanography was once called the Scripps Institution for Biological Research.

In 2022, Scripps Florida separated from Scripps Research and became a part of the University of Florida.

== Features ==
Scripps Research's California campus is located on 35 acres (140,000 m^{2}) of land between Torrey Pines State Natural Reserve and the University of California, San Diego, in La Jolla.

=== Departments and centers ===
Scripps Research emphasizes interdisciplinary studies. Scripps Research scientists are organized into five interrelated departments: Chemistry, Immunology and Microbiology, Integrative Structural and Computational Biology, Molecular Medicine, and Neuroscience.

The institute also incorporates the:

- Center for Antiviral Medicines and Pandemic Preparedness
- Center for Metabolomics
- Center for Viral Systems Biology
- Dorris Neuroscience Center
- IAVI's Neutralizing Antibody Center at Scripps Research
- Scripps Research Alcohol Research Center
- The Scripps Research Translational Institute
- Scripps Research Digital Trials Center
- Skaggs Institute for Chemical Biology
- Skaggs Graduate School
- West African Research Network for Infectious Diseases (WARN-ID)
- Worm Institute for Research and Medicine

=== Notable people ===
Among the 173 members of faculty are Nobel laureates Ardem Patapoutian, K. Barry Sharpless, and Kurt Wüthrich, as well as many other notable scientists, including Phil S. Baran, Donna Blackmond, Dale L. Boger, Benjamin Cravatt III, William R. Roush, Paul Schimmel, Peter G. Schultz, Gary Siuzdak, Eric Topol, Charles Weissmann, Ian Wilson, Peter Wright, Chi-Huey Wong and John R. Yates.

In addition to the Nobel laureates, the Scripps Research faculty includes numerous members of the National Academy of Sciences, National Academy of Medicine, American Academy of Arts and Sciences, National Academy of Engineering, American Association for the Advancement of Science and American Philosophical Society, as well as winners of the Wolf Prize in Chemistry and MacArthur Fellows Program ("genius grant").

The board of directors includes John D. Diekman (founder of 5AM Ventures), William R. Hearst III (chairman of the board, Hearst Communications), Ge Li (founder of WuXi AppTec), and Joel S. Marcus (founder, Alexandria Real Estate Equities, Inc.).

=== Research rankings ===
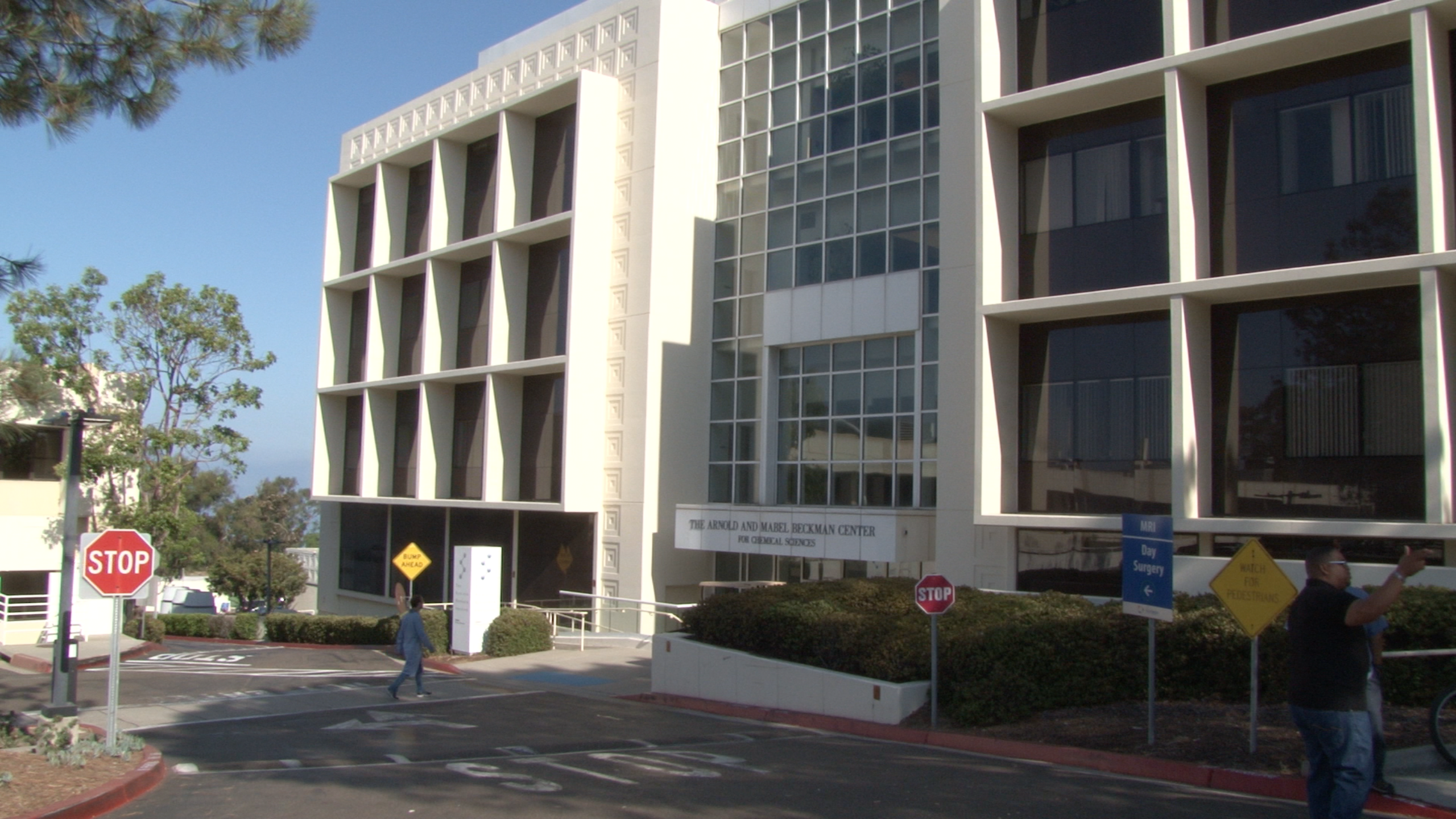
Exterior of Scripps Research's Beckman Center for Chemical Sciences

According to the 2017 Nature Innovation Index, Scripps Research is the #1 most influential research institution in the world (LENS score of 18.1), followed by The Rockefeller University (LENS score of 15.4) and the Massachusetts Institute of Technology (MIT) (LENS score of 9.4).

Scripps Research was noted as a standout in the Science Watch survey of "high-impact" papers in chemistry (1997–2008), ranked number one worldwide by citations per paper.

Another measure of productivity, the Hirsch index (which has been published by Chemistry World), placed six Scripps Research scientists – Wüthrich, Sharpless, Lerner, Yates, Schultz, and Chi-Huey Wong – in the top 100 of 2,000 chemists rated. Science Watch placed Sharpless within the Top 10 list of its "Top 100 Chemists 2000–2010" based on citations impact; other faculty in the list were the late Carlos F. Barbas and John R. Yates.

In addition, a Thomson-Reuters's list of researchers ranked in the top one percent by citations in their field (2002 to 2012) included TSRI researchers Phil S. Baran (chemistry); the late Carlos F. Barbas (chemistry); Dennis Burton (microbiology); Benjamin Cravatt III (biology and biochemistry); Pascal Poignard (microbiology); K. Barry Sharpless (chemistry); Eric Topol (genomic and digital medicine); Ian Wilson (structural biology); Richard Wyatt (microbiology); and Jin-Quan Yu (chemistry).

=== Medical contributions ===
Medical therapies based on Scripps Research findings include:

- Adalimumab (Humira) for rheumatoid arthritis and other inflammatory conditions
- Belimumab (Benlysta) for lupus
- Cladribine (Leustatin) for hairy cell leukemia
- Purification of Factor VIII for hemophilia
- Tafamidis (Vyndaqel) for transthyretin amyloidosis (ATTR)
- Lucinactant (Surfaxin) for infant respiratory distress syndrome
- Ramucirumab (Cyramza) for gastric and non-small cell lung cancer
- Dinutuximab (Unituxin) for the childhood cancer neuroblastoma
- Ozanimod (Zeposia) for multiple sclerosis
- COVID-19 mRNA vaccines for protection against the coronavirus SARS-CoV-2
- Pegvaliese (Palynziq) for phenylketonuria
- Sacituzumab govitecan (Trodelvy) for urinary tract cancers

== Education ==
=== Scripps Research's Graduate Program ===
The graduate program at Scripps Research started in 1989 as the Macromolecular and Cellular Structure and Chemistry (MCSC) Program. A program in Chemistry followed three years after the establishment of the MCSC Program. In 2003, the institute redefined the curriculum to allow and encourage students to build course loads in an interdisciplinary manner. In 2005, Scripps Research's graduate program expanded to encompass the Jupiter, Florida campus. Today, approximately 300 graduate students are enrolled in the program, which offers doctoral degrees in the chemical and biological sciences. In addition to its Ph.D. programs, Scripps Research offers a master's degree in the discipline of Clinical and Translational Investigation (MCTI) for physician-scientists. The institute also administers the Skaggs-Oxford Scholarship program, which enables students to pursue a joint Ph.D./D.Phil. with the University of Oxford.

The most recent graduate school rankings by U.S. News & World Report places Scripps Research's program as 6th in chemistry (2nd in biochemistry, 5th in organic chemistry) and 10th in biological sciences.

In 2018, the program was renamed the Skaggs Graduate School of Chemical and Biological Sciences following a gift from the Skaggs family.

=== Medical schools ===
Florida Atlantic University launched a new joint MD/PhD program association with Scripps Florida. The first students entered the new program in fall 2011. Previously, Scripps Research and the Scripps Health hospital network explored the idea of starting a medical school in California, but this project did not come to fruition.

=== Outreach programs ===
The California and Florida campuses both offer educational outreach programs for high school students and undergraduates interested in learning more about science.

== Scripps Florida ==
The Florida campus of Scripps Research operates a 350,000-square-foot (33,000 m^{2}) state-of-the-art biomedical research facility focusing on neuroscience, cancer biology, medicinal chemistry, drug discovery, biotechnology, and alternative energy development. More than 500 faculty, staff and students occupy Scripps Research's Florida campus.

The facility's grand opening took place on February 26, 2009, five years after Scripps Florida started operating. It was a public ceremony that drew many dignitaries, including then-governor Charlie Crist.

In 2022, Scripps Florida became a part of University of Florida Health. In October 2022, it received a $100 million donation from UF alumnus Herbert Wertheim. It was renamed Herbert Wertheim UF Scripps Institute for Biomedical Innovation & Technology after the donation. The Herbert Wertheim UF Scripps Institute received $64.8 million in annual research revenue in 2024.

== Funding ==
Grants and contracts provide funding for a significant portion of the institute's research. This revenue is derived primarily from the National Institutes of Health and other federal agencies. In addition, grantors include, among others, the American Cancer Society, the American Heart Association, the Cystic Fibrosis Foundation, the Leukemia & Lymphoma Society, and the Juvenile Diabetes Association.

Gifts from individuals and private foundations provide an important source of funding for Scripps Research. In 2008, Audrey Geisel had a star named after her in recognition of her 50 years of support.

Private foundations that have provided support include the ALSAM Foundation, Lucille P. Markey Charitable Trust, W.M. Keck Foundation, Arnold and Mabel Beckman Foundation, Pew Charitable Trusts, the Ellison Medical Foundation, Bill & Melinda Gates Foundation, and Harold L. Dorris Foundation.

The establishment of the Scripps Florida campus was made possible by a one-time $310 million appropriation of federal economic development funds and by the Florida State Legislature and by an economic package provided by Palm Beach County.
