= National Center for Functional Glycomics =

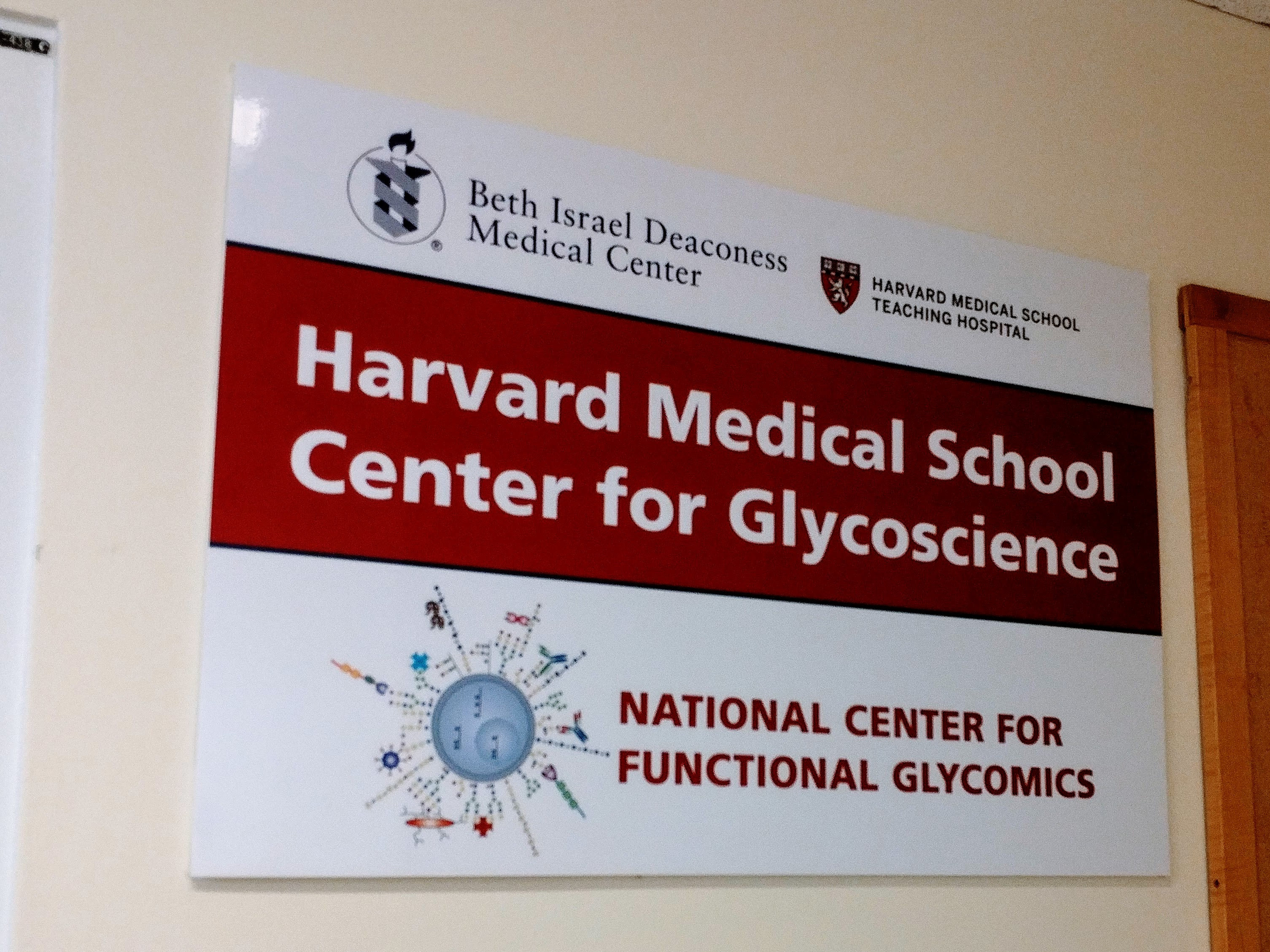
National Center for Functional Glycomics (NCFG)

The National Center for Functional Glycomics (NCFG) is an American organization that is focused on the development of technology development in glycosciences. They are specifically focused on glycan analysis and molecular mechanisms of glycan recognition by proteins important in human biology and disease. The center was established at Emory University in 2013 with $5.5 million funding by National Institutes of Health under the leadership of Richard D. Cummings. The center moved to Harvard University in September 2015 and is currently located at Beth Israel Deaconess Medical Center in Boston Massachusetts. The center is affiliated with the Consortium for Functional Glycomics.

The National Center for Functional Glycomics is one of four glycomics-related biomedical technology research resource centers in the United States. These centers provide unique technology and methods in the field of glycomics research. The center is responsible for services and training for outside investigators, as well as providing access and disseminating technologies, methods and software.

== Research projects ==
The center's projects are:

- Analysis of potential glycan-binding proteins on various glycan arrays (CFG glycan array, Microbial glycan array, NCFG-derived arrays)
- Structural analysis of glycans
- Production of naturally occurring glycans by isolation

=== Shotgun glycomics ===
The center researches shotgun glycomics techniques in which glycans harvested and purified from various materials such as breast milk and pig lungs. Such techniques developed by the center and other glycomics groups can further be applied to tissues to generate an overall glycome of the tissue for research into various diseases such as cancer, inflammation and autoimmune diseases.

=== Oxidative Release of Natural Glycans ===
The oxidative release of natural glycans technique was developed at the center. This process involves household bleach treatment of tissues to release glycans for glycomics. The eventual aim of this approach is to make glycomics accessible by a larger community of scientists by the development of tools which are easily available.

=== GlycoPattern ===
The National Center for Functional Glycomics has developed GlycoPattern, a web-based bioinformatics resource to assist in analysis of glycan array data. The GlycoPattern website offers tools and algorithms to discover structural motifs, heatmap visualizations for multiple experiment comparisons, clustering of Glycan Binding Proteins.
