= Consortium for Functional Glycomics =

Glycomics research initiative

- Formation: 2001
- Purpose: to define paradigms by which protein-carbohydrate interactions mediate cell communication
- Headquarters: The Scripps Research Institute
- Members: open to any investigator conducting grant-funded research on glycan-binding proteins or their ligands
- Principal Investigator: James Paulson, Ph.D.
- Budget: funded by a 10-year glue grant from the National Institute of General Medical Sciences, part of the U.S. National Institutes of Health (NIH)
- Website: http://www.functionalglycomics.org

The Consortium for Functional Glycomics (CFG) is a large research initiative funded in 2001 by a glue grant from the National Institute of General Medical Sciences (NIGMS) to “define paradigms by which protein-carbohydrate interactions mediate cell communication”. To achieve this goal, the CFG studies the functions of:

- the three major classes of mammalian glycan-binding proteins (GBPs): C-type lectin, galectin, and SIGLEC
- immune receptors that bind carbohydrates: CD1, T cell receptor, and anti-carbohydrate antibodies
- GBPs of microorganisms that bind to host cell glycans as receptors.

The CFG comprises eight core facilities and 500+ participating investigators that work together to develop resources and services and make them available to the scientific community free of charge. The data generated by these resources are captured in databases accessible through the Functional Glycomics Gateway, a web resource maintained through a partnership between the CFG and Nature Publishing Group.

== Organization ==
The CFG is composed of three main components: the participating investigators, the cores, and the steering committee.

=== Participating investigators ===
Progress towards the CFG's overall goal is driven by the research of more than 500 participating investigators] (PIs) around the world, whose laboratories utilize resources, services, and data produced by the CFG scientific cores.

The PIs are the largest component of the program, continuing to grow with new members each year. Each PI also has a program of research within the scope of the CFG, supported by non-CFG funds. Investigators apply for membership and must have a funded grant within the scope of the CFG, but they are not required to join the CFG to access resources. Several PIs also have CFG-funded bridging grants that are primarily tied to and enable the goals of the scientific cores, for the benefit of all PIs.

The PIs are organized into 10 subgroups led by subgroup leaders:

- Microorganism recognition of host glycans
- Immune recognition of glycans
- Glycans in immune cell communication
- Glycans in development and physiology
- Glycans in cancer biology
- Glycans in protein conformation and function
- Analytical glycomics
- Chemical synthesis and glycan microarrays
- 3-D Structural glycobiology
- Bioinformatics

The subgroups hold at least three workshops per year, where they have formed several working groups to leverage CFG funding in their efforts to define GBP biology. PI contributions toward elucidating paradigms that define GBP function are captured in the CFG's databases, as well as research publications and review articles.

=== Cores ===
The majority of CFG funds are invested in the scientific cores, which are responsible for generating novel resources, new technologies, and a platform of information that investigators use in their research. The eight CFG cores are described below:

- Administrative Core (A), located at The Scripps Research Institute, supports the CFG steering committee, cores, and participating investigators, plans meetings and workshops, publishes a quarterly newsletter, facilitates resource requests, tracks CFG-related publications, and writes progress reports to NIGMS. Core A also works closely with Core B to update and develop new content for the Functional Glycomics Gateway site.
- Bioinformatics Core (B), located at the Massachusetts Institute of Technology, is responsible for acquiring, storing, and disseminating all CFG-related data and information. For this purpose, Core B works with Nature Publishing Group to develop the CFG's Functional Glycomics Gateway site. Here, Core B has constructed complex relational databases to integrate diverse data sets generated by the CFG scientific cores and participating investigators, as well as data sets from other public databases. To increase the usability of these databases, Core B collaborates with the scientific cores to develop bioinformatics tools for data mining and prediction
- Analytical Glycotechnology Core (C), located at Imperial College London, offers mass spectrometry profiling of protein N- and O-linked glycans from mammalian cells, with highest priority given to pure populations of human or murine immune cells.
- Glycan Array Synthesis Core (D), located at The Scripps Research Institute, produces and collects carbohydrate compounds (monosaccharides, disaccharides, etc.), glycan-binding proteins, and anti-glycan antibodies for distribution to investigators. Many of these reagents were generously contributed by participating investigators. Core D also synthesizes glycans for and prints the CFG glycan array (see Core H below)
- Gene Microarray Core (E), located at The Scripps Research Institute, screens RNA samples provided by investigators on a custom-designed glycogene chip array developed using Affymetrix technology. The chip contains probe sets designed to monitor the expression of approximately 2000 human and mouse genes, including glycosyltransferases, glycan-binding proteins, glycan degradation proteins, intercellular protein transport proteins, sugar transporters, adhesion molecules, interleukins, mucins, growth factors, cytokines, chemokines, and more.
- Mouse Transgenics Core (F), formerly located at The Scripps Research Institute, is now closed. From 2001 to 2009, Core F generated 26 total and conditional knockout mouse lines deficient in glycan-binding proteins or glycosyltransferases. All Core F strains are now archived at the Mutant Mouse Regional Resource Center (MMRRC) at the University of California, Davis or The Jackson Laboratory (Jax). As a service to the community, the CFG still maintains a site in the Functional Glycomics Gateway to help investigators locate potential sources of glycogene knockout mouse lines.
- Mouse Phenotype Core (G), located at the Sanford-Burnham Medical Research Institute, works with participating investigator “mentors” to assess the histology, hematology, metabolism, immunological function, and behavior of Core F-generated mouse lines in order to describe the phenotypic results of deleting one or more glycogenes. At the discretion of the Mouse Subcommittee, Core G also occasionally evaluates mouse lines provided by investigators.
- Protein-Glycan Interaction Core (H), located at Emory University, analyzes investigator-generated lectins, antibodies, antisera, microorganisms, or suspected glycan-binding proteins of human, animal, and microbial origins on a mammalian glycan array to determine carbohydrate specificity and identify specific ligands. The current version of the array (v4.1), developed and printed by Core D, contains 465 different glycans.

=== Steering Committee ===
The CFG is managed by a steering committee chaired by James C. Paulson, Ph.D., professor at The Scripps Research Institute and Principal Investigator of the CFG glue grant. Eleven additional glycomics experts and one NIGMS scientific officer make up the rest of the committee.

Five subcommittees oversee the cores and make recommendations to the steering committee regarding resource priorities and technology development: Bioinformatics Subcommittee, Glycan Array/Carbohydrate Library Subcommittee, Glycan Analysis Subcommittee, Mouse Subcommittee, and Nomenclature Subcommittee.

== Resources ==
The CFG resources and services described above are free for the use of investigators studying the complex biology that governs the interactions of glycan-binding proteins and their ligands in mediating cell communication.

Resources can be requested by submitting a form at the Functional Glycomics Gateway website. Once a request is received, the appropriate core director reviews it and contacts the investigator if more information is needed. Once the core director finalizes a request and determines whether or not the core is capable of fulfilling it, the CFG Steering Committee reviews the request for final approval.

Membership in the CFG is not a requirement for receiving resources, but an investigator's institution must endorse the CFG's data sharing agreement to complete the resource request process.

== Databases ==
Data obtained by CFG scientific cores with samples submitted by PIs, and data obtained by investigators in their own labs using CFG resources, are uploaded into the CFG databases for dissemination to investigators and to the scientific community. Specialty databases for GBPs, glycan structures, and glycosyltransferases are designed to help integrate data and assess progress against the overall goal.

The easiest way to search through all CFG-related information is to enter a keyword (e.g. “galectin-1”, “sialic acid”, etc.) or IUPAC carbohydrate nomenclature in the search box at the top of the Functional Glycomics Gateway.

== Funding ==
In 2001, the CFG was awarded a five-year, $34 million glue grant] from NIGMS. In 2006, the CFG glue grant was renewed for another five years with an additional $40.7 million. Glue grant funding ended August 31, 2011. The CFG is seeking alternate funding to continue many aspects of the CFG beyond the glue grant funding period.
