= REG3A =

Protein-coding gene in the species Homo sapiens

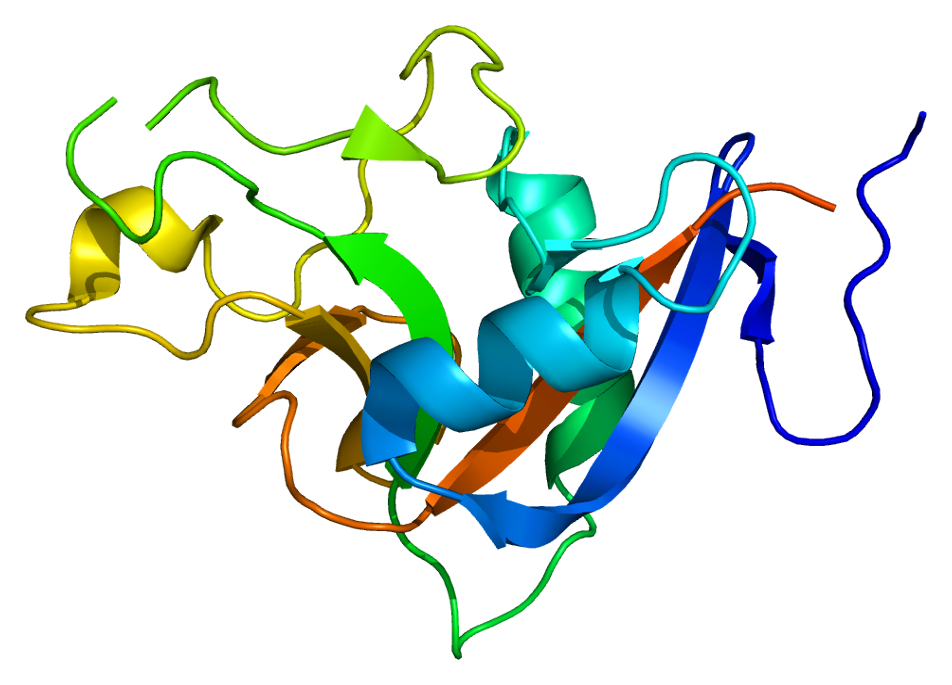

Identifiers
- Aliases: REG3A, HIP, HIP/PAP, INGAP, PAP, PAP-H, PAP1, PBCGF, REG-III, REG3, regenerating family member 3 alpha
- External IDs: OMIM: 167805; MGI: 97478; GeneCards: REG3A
Available structures
PDB	Ortholog search: PDBe RCSB
PDB	List of PDB id codes 1UV0, 2GO0, 4MTH

Gene location (Human)
Chr.	Chromosome 2 (human)
Band	2p12	Start	79,157,003 bp
Band	2p12	End	79,159,753 bp

Gene location (Mouse)
Chr.	Chromosome 6 (mouse)
Band	6|6 C3	Start	78,347,640 bp
Band	6|6 C3	End	78,350,449 bp
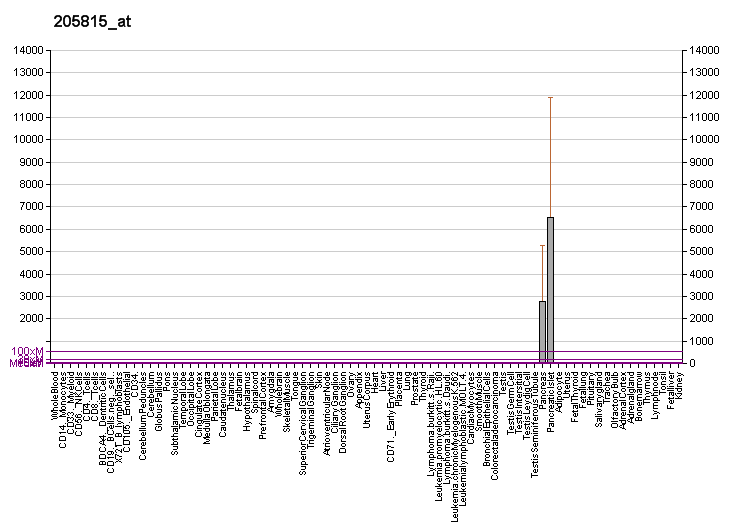
RNA expression pattern
Bgee	Human / Mouse (ortholog); Top expressed in: mucosa of ileum; jejunal mucosa; duodenum; body of pancreas; pancreatic ductal cell; islet of Langerhans; beta cell; testicle; pylorus; gallbladder / Top expressed in: Paneth cell; jejunum; duodenum; crypt of lieberkuhn of small intestine; intestinal villus; ileum; Ileal epithelium; pyloric antrum; islet of Langerhans; lumbar subsegment of spinal cord; More reference expression data
BioGPS	More reference expression data
Gene ontology
Molecular function	protein binding; carbohydrate binding; identical protein binding; transmembrane signaling receptor activity; peptidoglycan binding; oligosaccharide binding
Cellular component	cytoplasm; extracellular region; extracellular space
Biological process	inflammatory response; multicellular organism development; negative regulation of keratinocyte differentiation; positive regulation of keratinocyte proliferation; cell population proliferation; heterophilic cell-cell adhesion via plasma membrane cell adhesion molecules; positive regulation of wound healing; acute-phase response; antimicrobial humoral response; positive regulation of cell population proliferation; response to peptide hormone; cell wall disruption in other organism; antimicrobial humoral immune response mediated by antimicrobial peptide
Sources:Amigo / QuickGO
Orthologs
Databases	NCBI: entry; OMA: entry
Species	Human	Mouse
Entrez	5068	18489
Ensembl	ENSG00000172016	ENSMUSG00000071356
UniProt	Q06141	P35230
RefSeq (mRNA)	NM_138938; NM_002580; NM_138937	NM_011036
RefSeq (protein)	NP_002571; NP_620354; NP_620355	NP_035166
Location (UCSC)	Chr 2: 79.16 – 79.16 Mb	Chr 6: 78.35 – 78.35 Mb
PubMed search
- Wikidata
View/Edit Human	View/Edit Mouse

Regenerating islet-derived protein 3 alpha (or Regenerating islet-derived protein III-alpha) formerly known as HIP/PAP (Hepatocarcinoma-Intestine-Pancreas/Pancreatitis-Associated Protein) and peptide 23 is a protein that in humans is encoded by the REG3A gene.

This gene encodes a pancreatic secretory protein that may be involved in cell proliferation or differentiation. It has similarity to the C-type lectin superfamily. The enhanced expression of this gene is observed during pancreatic inflammation and liver carcinogenesis. Multiple alternatively spliced transcript variants encoding the same protein have been described for this gene but the full length nature of some transcripts is not yet known.

Reg3A (UniProt Q0614 1) is a bactericidal C-type lectin that is constitutively produced in the intestine that has antibacterial properties against Gram-positive bacteria. Bacterial killing is mediated by binding to surface-exposed carbohydrate moieties of bacterial peptidoglycan and executed by the formation of a hexameric pore in the membrane.
